= Southeast Asian haze =

Fire-related transboundary haze issue

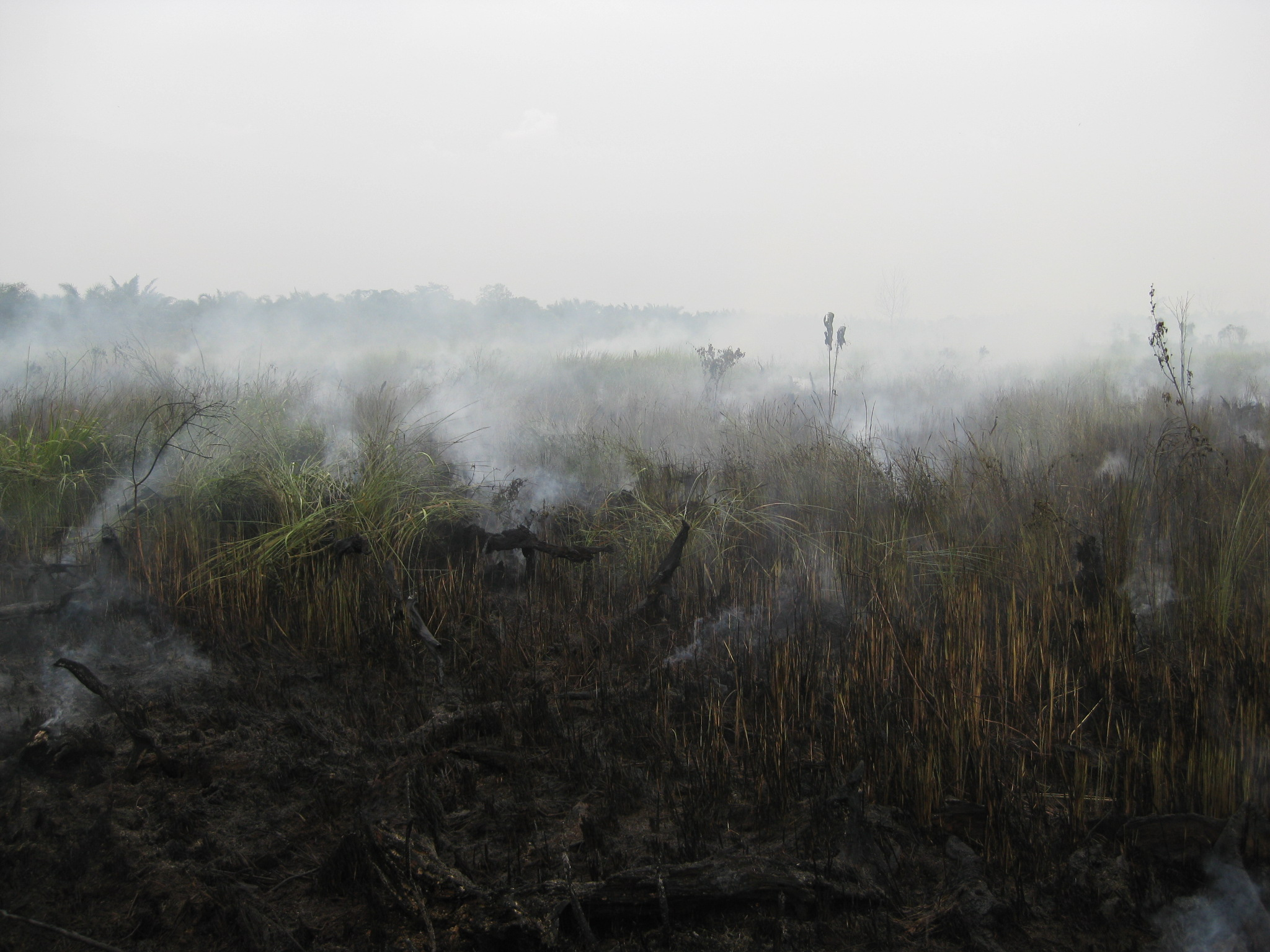
A peat fire near the Raja Musa Forest Reserve in Selangor, Malaysia (2013). The fires are below the surface, where the peat is smoldering.

The Southeast Asian haze is a fire-related recurrent transboundary air pollution issue. Haze events, where air quality reaches hazardous levels due to high concentrations of airborne particulate matter from burning biomass, have caused adverse health, environmental and economic impacts in several countries in Southeast Asia. Caused primarily by slash-and-burn land clearing, the problem flares up every dry season to varying degrees and generally is worst between July and October and during El Niño events. Transboundary haze in Southeast Asia has been recorded since 1972 with the 1997 and 2015 events being particularly severe.

Industrial-scale slash-and-burn practices to clear land for agricultural purposes are a major cause of the haze, particularly for palm oil and pulpwood production in the region. Burning land occurs as it is cheaper and faster compared to cutting and clearing using excavators or other machinery. Fires started for this purpose sometimes spread and create forest fires, worsening the problem. The high concentration of peat in soil contributes to the haze's density and high sulphur content.

Fires in Indonesia (particularly South Sumatra and Riau in Sumatra, and Kalimantan in Borneo), and to a lesser extent in Malaysia and Thailand, have been identified as sources. The haze regularly has a major impact on air quality in Indonesia, Malaysia, Singapore and Brunei Darussalam; to a lesser extent and in particularly severe years, it also impacts the Philippines, Thailand, Vietnam, Cambodia and countries outside the region.

Haze events have been shown to cause health issues and mortality in affected areas, and have caused disruption to economic activity and education as sectors are forced to close to minimise exposure to hazardous air. The haze also has a substantial environmental impact, being a major contributor to greenhouse gas emissions in the region and affecting wildlife and ecosystems.

The haze is an international issue which has caused regional political tensions. Efforts have been made to mitigate haze events and their impacts, and some relevant frameworks for regional cooperation among ASEAN countries have been introduced. Challenges remain in implementing these, and mitigation efforts have failed to prevent haze from reoccurring.

== History ==
Southeast Asian haze has frequently reoccurred, with the severity and regions affected differing between seasons. The issue has been recorded since 1972. The 1997 Southeast Asian haze, caused by major forest fires in Indonesia, is thought to be the most severe on record, leading to dangerous pollution across most of Southeast Asia and affecting air quality as far as Sri Lanka. The 2015 haze has also been highlighted as a particularly severe year. In 2020, lockdowns and other social movement restrictions introduced due to the COVID-19 pandemic are thought to have reduced air pollution across the region.

The Southeast Asian Haze, El Niño, and Positive Indian Ocean Dipole
	Haze	El Niño	Positive Indian Ocean Dipole
1997	1997 Southeast Asian haze 1997 Indonesian forest fires	1997–98	1997–98
2005	2005 Malaysian haze	2004–05	
2006	2006 Southeast Asian haze	2006–07	2006
2009	2009 Southeast Asian haze	2009–10	
2010	2010 Southeast Asian haze	2009–10	
2013	2013 Southeast Asian haze	—	
2015	2015 Southeast Asian haze	2014–16	
2016	2016 Southeast Asian haze	2014–16	
2017	2017 Southeast Asian haze	—	
2019	2019 Southeast Asian haze	2018–19	2019
2026	2026 Southeast Asian haze	2026–27	2026

== Causes ==
Most haze events have resulted from smoke from fires that occurred on peatlands in Sumatra and the Kalimantan region of Borneo island. Poor accountability and transparency of Indonesian agricultural companies, and limited political and economic incentives to hold companies to account, have been identified as key barriers to mitigating the issue.

Undisturbed humid tropical forests are considered to be very resistant to fire, experiencing rare fires only during extraordinary dry periods.

A study published in 2005 concluded that there is no single dominant cause of fire in a particular site and there are wide differences in the causes of fires in different sites. The study identified the following direct and indirect causes of fire:

- Direct causes of fire
  - Fire as a tool in land clearing
  - Fire as a weapon in land tenure or land use disputes
  - Accidental or escaped fires
  - Fire connected with resource extraction
- Indirect causes of fire
  - Land tenure and land use allocation conflicts and competition
  - Forest degrading practices
  - Economic incentives/disincentives
  - Population growth and migration
  - Inadequate fire fighting and management capacity

=== Land clearing ===
Fire is the cheapest and fastest method to clear land in preparation for planting. Fire is used to clear the plant material left over from logging or old crops. Mechanically raking the plant material into long piles and letting them rot over time, is expensive and slow, and could harbour pests. Clearing land with machines and chemicals can cost up to US$200 per hectare while using fire costs US$5 per hectare.

After a peat swamp forest has been cleared and drained, the peat soil is still unsuitable for agriculture, because peat soil is nutrient-poor and acidic (pH 3 - 4). To make the soil suitable for agriculture, the pH has to be neutralised and nutrients added. Pests and plant diseases also have to be removed. One method is to use chemicals such as limestone to neutralise the acidity, as well as fertilisers and pesticides. This method costs about Rupiah 30 - 40 million per hectare. Alternatively, fire is used to clear the plant material left over from logging. The fire kills pests and the resulting ash serves to fertilise the soil and neutralise the acidity. This method costs Rupiah 2 million per hectare.

=== Land conflicts ===
In Indonesia, the Basic Forestry Law grants the Ministry of Forestry authority over all land classified as forests. Approximately 49% of the nation (909,070 square kilometres) is covered by actual forest, although the government classifies 69% of the land area (1,331,270 square kilometres) as forest. The land rights of traditional communities that live on land classified as forest cannot be registered and are generally unrecognised by the state. Therefore, these communities do not really have the ability to enforce rules at the village level and exclude outsiders such as oil palm plantations, logging companies, residents of other villages, migrants, small-scale loggers or transmigrants. Competing claims in turn leads to land conflicts. As the number of new, external actors increases, so does the likelihood that fire will be used as a weapon.

=== Peat fires ===
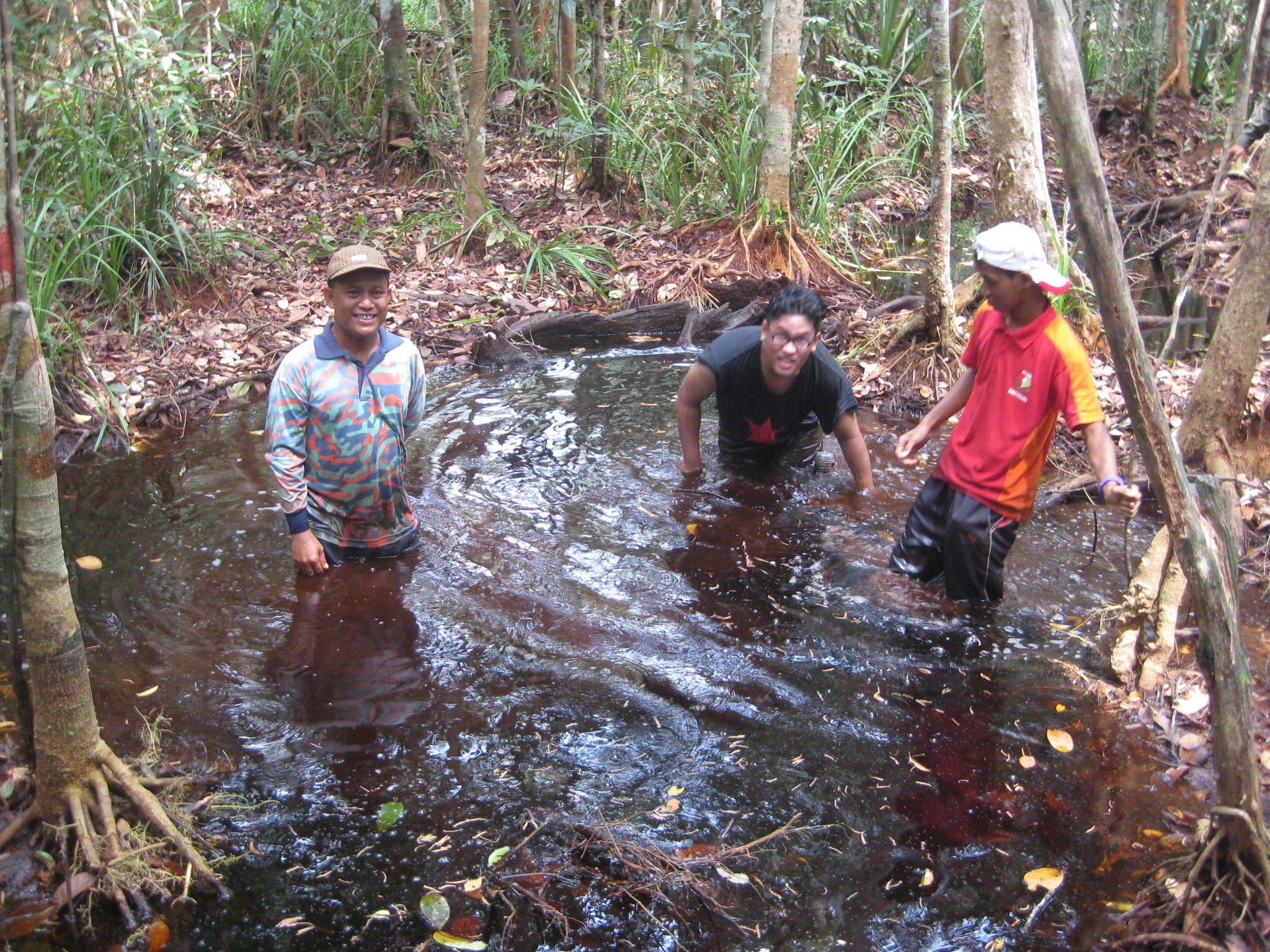
Peat forms under waterlogged conditions in peat swamp forests such as this one in Raja Musa Forest Reserve, Selangor, Malaysia.

A peatland is an area where organic material such as leaves and twigs had accumulated naturally under waterlogged conditions in the last 10,000 years. This layer of organic material, known as peat, can be up to 20m deep. Indonesia has 265,500 km^{2} of peatland, which comprises 13.9% of its land area. Malaysia also has significant peatland in the Peninsular and Borneo, at 26,685 km^{2}, covering 8.1% of its land area.

Although originally a wetland ecosystem, much of the peatland in Southeast Asia have been drained for human activities such as agriculture, forestry and urban development. A report published in 2011 stated that more than 30% of peat swamp forests had been converted to agricultural land and a further 30% had been logged or degraded in the past 20 to 30 years. Excessive drainage in peat results in the top layer of peat drying out. Due to its high carbon content, dry peat is extremely susceptible to burning, especially during the dry season. Peat fires often smoulder underground for months even despite surface rain.

Studies have shown that peat fires are a major contributor to the haze. In 2009, around 40% of all fires in Peninsular Malaysia, Borneo, Sumatra and Java were detected in peatlands, even though they cover only 10% of the land area studied. The concentration of sulphur in rain falling over Singapore in 1997 correlated closely with the PM_{2.5} concentration, which can be attributed to the strong sulphur emission from peat fires.

=== El Niño–Southern Oscillation and Positive Indian Ocean Dipole ===
El Niño–Southern Oscillation (ENSO) is a global climate phenomenon that emerges from variation in winds and sea surface temperatures over the tropical Pacific Ocean. El Niño is associated with the development of a band of warm ocean water in the central and east-central equatorial Pacific and higher than normal sea level air pressure over Indonesia and Australia, and across the Indian Ocean to the Atlantic Ocean, hence with rainfall reducing over Indonesia, India and northern Australia, while rainfall and tropical cyclone formation increases over the tropical Pacific Ocean. ENSO indicates drought, increases the duration of haze and adds PM2.5.

Indian Ocean Dipole (IOD), also called the Indian Ocean Zonal Mode, is an irregular oscillation of sea surface temperatures in which the western Indian Ocean becomes alternately warmer (positive phase) and then colder (negative phase) than the eastern part of the ocean. A positive IOD phase sees greater-than-average sea-surface temperatures and greater precipitation in the western Indian Ocean region, with a corresponding cooling of waters in the eastern Indian Ocean—which tends to cause droughts in adjacent land areas of Indonesia and Australia. Positive Indian Ocean Dipole causes drought and increased fire potential in Indonesia.

There is study about interaction of both ENSO and IOD. ENSO timing is important for IOD development, while IOD can influence onset and decay of ENSO.

== Effects ==
Haze related damages can be attributed to two sources: the haze causing fire and the haze itself. Each of the two factors can create significant disruption to people's daily lives and affect people's health. As a whole the recurring haze incidents affected regional economy and generated contention between governments of nations affected.

=== Direct fire damage ===
Haze fires can cause many kinds of damage that are local as well as transboundary. These include loss of direct and indirect forest benefits, timber, agricultural products and biodiversity. The fires also incur significant firefighting costs and carbon release to the atmosphere.

Forest fires that contribute to haze are a part of deforestation in Indonesia and Malaysia, a major environmental issue.

=== Economy ===
Some of the more direct damage caused by haze includes damage to regional tourism during haze periods, as flights have to be cancelled or delayed during particularly severe events. The haze also leads to industrial production losses, airline and airport losses, damage to fisheries, and incurs the costs on cloud seeding. In addition, severe haze weather can lead to reduced crop productivity, accidents, evacuations, and the loss of confidence of foreign investors.

The 1997 Southeast Asian haze is thought to have led to US$9bn in damages across ASEAN whilst the 2015 haze cost Indonesia alone an estimated $16bn.

=== Education ===
School closures have affected many parts of Malaysia, Singapore and Indonesia, sometimes for several weeks, due to hazardous air pollution.

=== Health ===
The health effects of haze depend on its severity as measured by the Pollutants Standards Index (PSI). Levels above 100 are classified as unhealthy and anything above 300 as hazardous. There is also individual variation regarding the ability to tolerate air pollution. Most people would at most experience sneezing, running nose, eye irritation, dry throat and dry cough from the pollutants.

However, persons with medical conditions like asthma, chronic lung disease, chronic sinusitis and allergic skin conditions are likely to be more severely affected by the haze and they may experience more severe symptoms. Children and the elderly in general are more likely to be affected. For some, symptoms may worsen with physical activity. One study linked the haze to increased lung cancer diagnoses in Malaysia.

The transboundary Southeast Asian haze has been linked to various cardiovascular conditions including acute ischemic stroke, acute myocardial infarction and cardiac arrest. These studies found dose-dependent effect of PSI on the risk of development these conditions. There appears to be increased susceptibility amongst the elderly and those with history of heart disease and diabetes mellitus. The risk is elevated for several days after exposure. PSI during periods of haze has also been correlated with all-cause mortality, as well as respiratory-illnesses that presented to Emergency Departments and hospital admissions.

The 1997 Southeast Asian haze is estimated to have directly led to 40,000 hospitalisations. A 2016 study estimated the 2015 Southeast Asian haze may have caused around 100,000 deaths, most of which were in Indonesia; the BBC estimated over 500,000 suffered from respiratory ailments in the same season.

A population study found that individuals experienced mild psychological stress, which was associated with the perceived dangerous PSI level and the number of physical symptoms.

=== Environment ===
In addition to the direct burning of rainforest, the haze also harms wildlife in the region such as orangutans, birds and amphibians, by impacting their health and reproduction. It has also been suggested that haze affects marine ecosystems.

The haze also contributes to greenhouse gas emissions, to an extent that Indonesia's national daily emissions increased tenfold and temporarily exceeded that of China and the United States during the 2015 haze season. Deforestation in Indonesia contributed to the country being the third highest emitter in the world as of 2013. Commentators have suggested Indonesia's emissions during haze seasons undermine potential efforts to reach its pledged Nationally Determined Contribution under the Paris Agreement.

== Responses ==
Countries have responded to haze events with state of emergency declarations, cloud seeding to clear air and mobilising firefighting resources to areas being burned. The public have also been recommended to stay at home with the doors closed, and wear face masks when outside to minimise exposure to hazardous air quality. During the severe 1997 haze caused primarily by forest fires in Indonesia, Malaysian Prime Minister Mahathir Mohamad announced Operation Haze, sending Malaysian firefighters to Indonesia to support the response.

Singapore and Malaysia continuously monitor and report air pollution levels, using the Pollutant Standards Index and Air Pollution Index, respectively.

ASEAN introduced a Transboundary Haze agreement in 2002 following the severe international impact of the 1997 haze. Indonesia became the last country in ASEAN to ratify it in 2014, despite its major contribution to the issue.

Singapore introduced the Transboundary Haze Pollution Act 2014, that criminalises activities overseas that contribute to haze. Implementation of the domestic act to mitigate the regional issue has been challenging, and has affected Indonesia–Singapore relations. Singapore's investigations into individuals involved in the 2015 haze were accepted by Indonesia, on the condition that it did not violate Indonesian sovereignty. Efforts have been made to introduce a similar domestic law in Malaysia, although the government shelved this in 2020.

The Roundtable on Sustainable Palm Oil added "no peat" to its certification scheme in response to the link between palm oil and peat burning.

== See also ==
- ASEAN Agreement on Transboundary Haze Pollution
- Asian Brown Cloud
- Chemical Equator
- Peat swamp forest
- Air pollution in Malaysia
- Environmental issues in Indonesia
- Deforestation in Indonesia
- Palm oil production in Indonesia
- Stubble burning
