= 2026 Southeast Asian haze =

Air pollution crisis in Asia

- Part of Southeast Asian haze and 2026 Indonesia wildfires
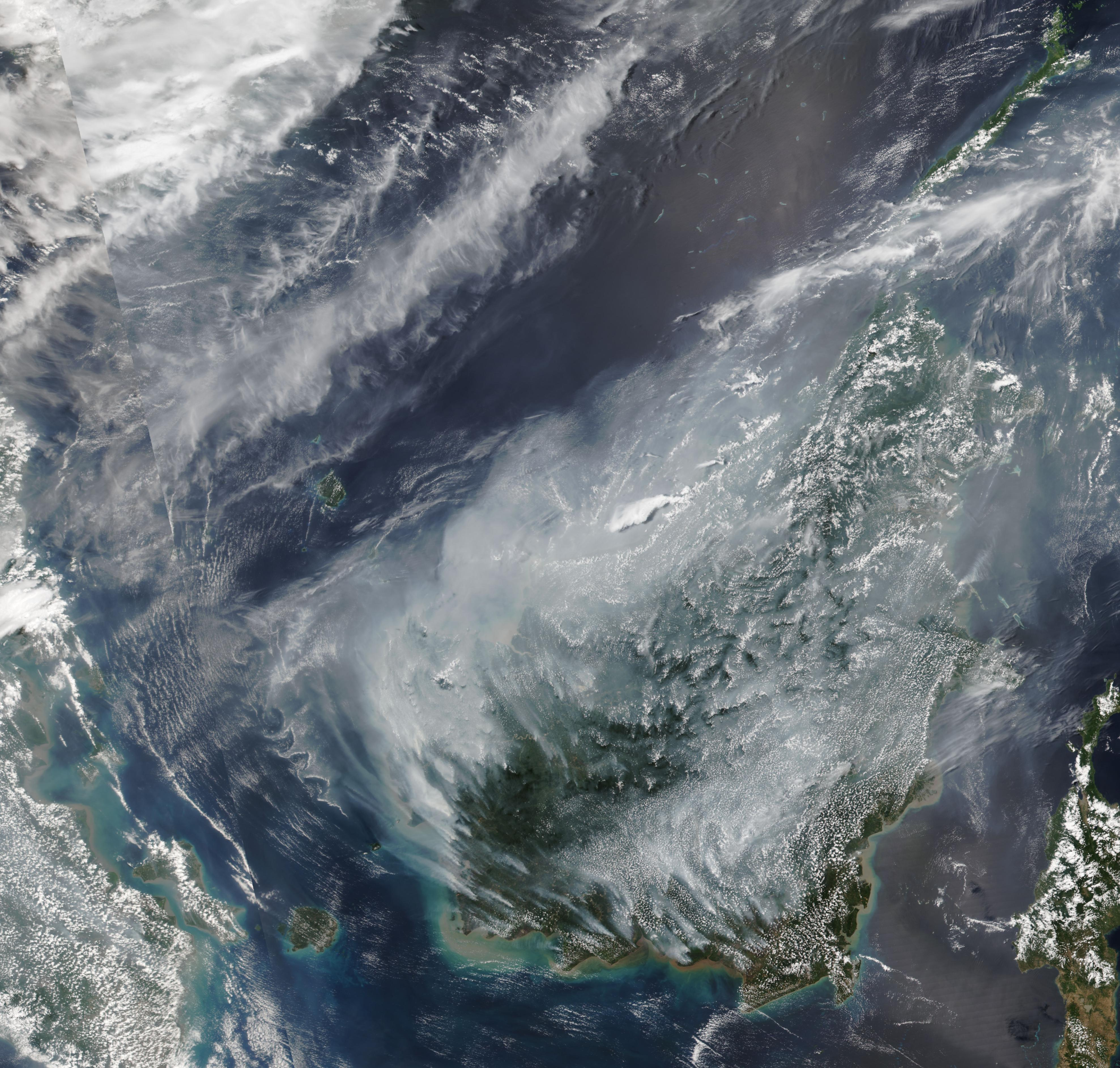
- Haze over Borneo on 1 September 2026, pictured by the National Oceanic and Atmospheric Administration
- Duration: August 2026 – late October 2026
- Location: Australia; Brunei; India (suspected); Indonesia (main origin); Malaysia; Papua New Guinea (second origin); Philippines; Singapore; Thailand; Timor-Leste; Vietnam (suspected)
- Also known as: Karhutla 2026 (Note: Indonesian syllabic abbreviation for Kebakaran Hutan dan Lahan (lit. 'Forest and Land Fire'))
- Cause: 2026 Indonesia wildfires; 2026–2027 El Niño event; Positive Indian Ocean Dipole
- Outcome: List: School and education institution closures in several countries; Cancellation/Limitation of several outdoor events and outdoor activities in several countries; Delay of several sport events in several countries; Large-scale cloud seeding operations in Malaysia, Singapore, Indonesia, and Brunei; Sarawak, Australia, Singapore, and Brunei agreed to join on handling to end transboundary haze crisis and completely stop the illegal open fire burning and illegal deforestation activities in Indonesia and Malaysia
- Deaths: 1,700+ deaths from fire-related pollution 2,000+ deaths from non-fire-related pollution
- Arrests: 223 people
- Accused: 223 people have been arrested for allegedly starting illegal forest and land fires in Indonesia; 7 companies has been issued warnings for involving in the haze; 7 agriculture companies has been under investigations for possible links to the fires in Indonesia

The 2026 Southeast Asian haze crisis was an air pollution event and the former transboundary haze season that was affecting several countries in Southeast Asia from August to late October 2026, including Brunei, Indonesia, Malaysia, the Philippines, Thailand, Timor Leste, and Singapore. As wildfires are also happening in Papua New Guinea, the haze has affected the country as well as causing transboundary haze to Australia and several islands of Eastern Indonesia including Lesser Sunda, Maluku, Papua and Sulawesi. The haze is also suspected to have reached southern Vietnam and Nicobar Islands, India.

This particular haze season was severely exacerbated by a record-strength El Niño climate cycle. Triggering the highest-level environmental alerts across the region, the dense particulate smog has blanketed neighbouring nations, resulting in widespread school closures, flight cancellations, and hundreds of thousands of respiratory illness cases.

The environmental disaster has significantly strained Indonesia's bilateral relations with Malaysia and Singapore. Tensions rapidly escalated due to the Indonesian government's defensive public reactions, including dismissing the toxic smoke as a natural phenomenon, its ambiguity to formally accept external firefighting aid from its neighbours, and highly criticised statements from state communications officials claiming that neighbouring countries should be grateful for the oxygen Indonesian forests provide when there are no fires.

Heavy rains in Sumatra and Kalimantan in late October 2026 significantly dropped the size and number of forest fires, and improved the air quality in most countries across Southeast Asia. In turn, the National Environmental Agency of Singapore stopped issuing haze advisories from 7th November 2026.

== Background and causes ==
The haze is attributed to the ongoing 2026 Indonesia wildfires, particularly fires in parts of Sumatra, Kalimantan and Papua. The forecasted El Niño has been the strongest ever measured, which intensifies drought and wildfire haze spread, challenging wildfire reduction. Moreover, positive Indian Ocean Dipole (IOD) amplifies the risk of wildfire and haze. The combination of both El Niño and positive IOD causes drier ground cover and adds the risk for severe fires in September–October. During periods of dry weather, vegetation and peatlands become highly susceptible to fire. Smoke and fine particulate matter generated by these fires can be transported by prevailing winds across national borders, affecting air quality in neighbouring countries such as Malaysia and Singapore.

== Affected countries ==
=== Indonesia ===
In West Kalimantan, the worsening conditions are being closely watched from Sarawak, given the proximity of the two regions and the potential for haze to be carried across the border by prevailing winds.

On 16 October, the haze has spread across several provinces of Java island, affecting Banten, West Java and the capital of Indonesia, Jakarta. By then, the haze had spread across every islands within the country, affecting almost every province of Indonesia.

=== Malaysia ===
Government ministry buildings and boulevard along Persiaran Perdana in Putrajaya shrouded in dense smog and haze in October.

The government of Sarawak, in response to the rising API levels, activated its Sarawak State Disaster Management Committee (SDMC or JPBNS) to monitor air quality and issue protective measures for its citizens, including face mask mandates and the cancellation or closure of events and public buildings.

On 10 August, a forest fire broke out in Sri Aman, Sarawak, that it could worsen the haze. It affected 80 hectares and continued at least for five days.

There were several forest fires happened in Sarawak. Another forest fire affected 15 hectares land in Daro, Sarawak for eight days since 10 August. On 11 August, another forest fire happens in Lundu, Sarawak. On 14 August, another forest fire happens in Lundu, Sarawak.

On 21 August, Sarawak continued to experience the second wave of transboundary haze season, with Serian surging the highest Air Pollutant Index (API) reading in Sarawak at 242, placing the area in the "Very Unhealthy" category. The SDMC data showed eight other areas in Sarawak recording the unhealthy air quality, underscoring the widening impact of the transboundary haze. These affected areas were Serian at 191, Lubok Antu (189), Kuching (188), Sri Aman and Lundu (178), Samarahan (171), Tebedu (164), Sarikei (153), and Sibu (125).

The SDMC said that they were closely monitoring weather conditions, air quality, hotspots, the risk of forest and peatland fires, and the status of the state's water supply was continuing in coordination with relevant agencies. The intensified monitoring reflects growing concern over the wider environmental and public health risks posed by the worsening haze, particularly in areas close to Kalimantan.

On 24 August, Pengerang, Johor, recorded a peatland fire for 51.4 hectares of peatland and dry grass. The peatland and dry grass fire concluded at noon on August 28.

On 29 August, Serian recorded a hazardous air quality (302). The condition worsens, and on 4 September, Yang di-Pertuan Agong, Sultan Ibrahim, with advice from Prime Minister Anwar Ibrahim and Sarawak Premier Abang Johari Openg, declared an emergency after the AQI reached over 500. Cloud seeding operations have been approved in affected areas to mitigate the air quality issues and supplement the area's available water resources.

On 31 August, one of Sawarak's monitoring stations recorded an API level of 475. Douglas Uggah Embas said that the National Disaster Management Agency (NDMA) may declare an emergency should the API reach 500. Sawarak has also cancelled their National Day activities due to the haze.

On 6 September, another 10 hectare peatland fire happened on Pengerang, Johor. It controlled on 8 September.

On 18 September, according to Environment Department's Air Pollutant Index Management System (APIMS), 34 of 68 stations nationwide recording unsafe levels, with several regions edging dangerously close to the "Very Unhealthy" level. Johan Setia in Selangor recorded the nation's worst air quality at 198, followed closely by Kuching (192) and Samarahan (184) in Sarawak. Heavy haze also gripped Peninsular Malaysia, with Nilai logging a reading of 181, Seri Manjung at 176, Putrajaya at 173, and both Shah Alam and Seremban at 171. In Sarawak, Serian also recorded an unhealthy reading of 180. Out of 68 stations nationwide, only three logged "Good" air quality, all located in East Malaysia: Limbang, Sarawak (49; Sandakan, Sabah (46); and Kota Kinabalu, Sabah (44).

On 6 October, Batu Pahat recorded an API of 203 at the "very unhealthy" range, which was the highest reading in Malaysia at the time.

=== Brunei ===
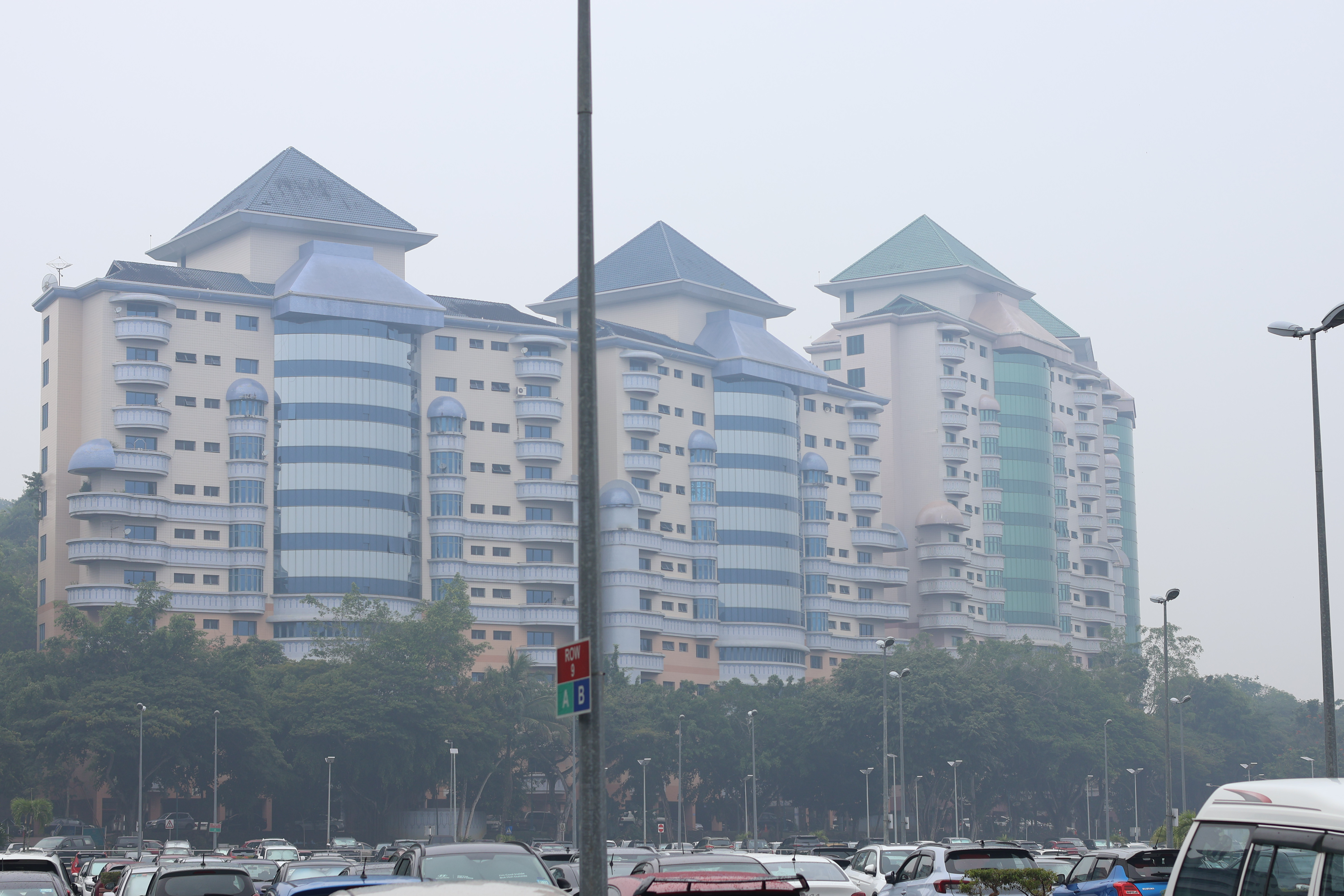
Haze covering over Ong Sum Ping Armada Properties buildings, Brunei

The Department of Environment, Parks and Recreation under the Ministry of Development on 31 August at 11 am recorded 94 pollutant standard index (PSI) for Brunei-Muara, 79 at Tutong, 95 at Belait and 69 at Temburong which was considered in the 'moderate' category (51 PSI - 100 PSI).

On 1 September at 4 pm, after taking account of both particulate matter (PM_{10}) and particulate matter 2.5 (PM_{2.5}), readings from two districts were categorized in the 'Very unhealthy' category (201 PSI - 300 PSI). Brunei-Muara recorded 215 PSI, 168 at Tutong, 211 at Belait and 164 at Temburong.

The Ministry of Education and Ministry of Religious Affairs advised all government and private institutions to implement a Home-Based Learning (HBL) from 2 to 3 September.

=== Singapore ===
Haze as seen near Victoria Street

Tanjong Rhu as viewed with clear skies in the early morning of 1 August 2026.

Haze settled over the same area in the afternoon of 14 September.

Haze settled over the same area in the morning of 16 October.

In May 2026, the National Environment Agency (NEA) and Meteorological Service Singapore (MSS) warned that there is an increased likelihood that Singapore could experience haze from June to October due to the effects of El Niño–Southern Oscillation and the Indian Ocean Dipole. The NEA stated that smoke haze from southern Sumatra and West Kalimantan was observed to drift towards Singapore.

On 4 September, the Central Region (Note: Central Region in this case refers to, the areas around the Central Catchment Area.) entered the Unhealthy range (100 - 200 PSI) with a PSI of 101 at 7 am. This was the first time since October 2023 that the PSI hit the 'Unhealthy' category. The Haze Task Force announced that should the PSI enter the 'Very Unhealthy' category (201 - 300 PSI), air-conditioned rooms in all community centres (CCs) and selected residents’ committees (RCs) will be on standby. The NEA also announced that it would begin providing daily haze advisories, including the additional 24-hour PSI forecast.

On 7 October, with a 1-hour PM_{2.5} reading of 152 at 4 pm, the Western region entered the high range (151–250) for the first time in this haze season, and on 9 October, the Central Region recorded a PSI of 181 at 12 pm, rising to 192 from 5 pm to 8 pm, the highest recorded in 2026. The Haze Task Force announced that N95 masks have been set aside and will be distributed to those who are more affected by the haze should the PSI reach the very unhealthy range (201–300). School closures were considered if the 24-hour PSI forecast is above 300, at the hazardous range.

On 14 October, the West Region recorded a PM_{2.5} of 288 at 3 pm, entering the very high band, the highest reading since 2015. At that time, PM_{2.5} readings were also at the high range for the South, Central, and Eastern regions, with readings of 177, 218, and 208, respectively. The 24-hour PSI was also in the unhealthy band across all regions. Many outdoor facilities managed by ActiveSG in the west, as well as outdoor activities in some schools, were closed or suspended due to the worsening haze, while N95 masks and air-conditioned haze shelters were made available from that day. The haze negatively affected businesses and food delivery riders, with a drop of up to 60% for businesses since the haze began.

The 24-hour PSI readings of three regions in the country reached the very unhealthy range on 16 October, the 12th consecutive day where the air quality was poor since 2015. The readings in central Singapore entered the very unhealthy range at midnight, and reached 229 at 3 pm, making the new highest of the year in Singapore.

The haze improved throughout the country on 19 October, with the one-hour PM_{2.5} readings across all five regions decreasing back into the normal range, albeit momentarily, as the 24-hour PSI and 1-hour PM_{2.5} readings increased the following day. The air quality improved throughout the country on 22 October, with the 24-hour PSI of all regions being in the moderate range by 3 pm. Hourly PM_{2.5} readings were also in the normal range for all regions.

Due to improving haze conditions, the Singapore government announced on 5 November they would close all air-conditioned rooms serving as haze shelters and cease all haze mitigation procedures from 7 November, including ending the distribution of N95 masks to vulnerable Singaporeans and daily advisories. The Ministry of Health would also deactivate both the Public Health Preparedness Clinic (PHPC) Scheme and the Haze Subsidy Scheme from 12 November, with that the 24hr PSI has even lowered down to 45.

The haze episode was estimated to cost Singapore's economy $2.32 billion as at 31 October, about 4% higher than in 2015.

=== Philippines ===
In early September 2026, the haze had reached and affected air quality across several parts of the Philippines after smoke from fires in Kalimantan, Indonesia was carried by prevailing monsoon winds. Metro Manila, Calabarzon and Mimaropa were among the affected areas, with several cities recording very unhealthy to acutely unhealthy air quality levels. In Quezon City, face-to-face classes in public schools were suspended due to hazardous air pollution, while similar suspensions were implemented in parts of Metro Cebu as the haze persisted.

Authorities advised residents to limit outdoor exposure and wear properly fitted particulate masks, such as N95 or KN95 masks, particularly in areas with unhealthy air quality. The haze also affected parts of the Visayas and Mindanao, including Iloilo, Cebu and Zamboanga City, highlighting the wide geographical reach of the transboundary pollution.

=== Vietnam ===
On 14 September, the haze reached southern Vietnam as the winds over the southern ASEAN region were forecasted to blow mainly from the southeast. The haze persisted until 16 September even the heavy rain had occurred in the late afternoon and evening a day earlier, leading to the speculation that smoke from fires in Indonesia may be responsible. However, there was not yet enough evidence to draw that conclusion.

=== Timor-Leste ===
On 15 October, the government shut down schools as the haze from Indonesia had become very dangerous.

=== Papua New Guinea ===
On 15 October, haze from domestic and neighbouring Indonesia region of Papua wildfires has reached the capital city Port Moresby. A third of Lou Island caught wild bushfire. Meanwhile, another bushfire swept Gorokabu, Chuave, Simbu on 17 October.

=== India ===
On 16 October, residents of Great Nicobar Island reported hazy condition that persisted until 18 October. The haze is suspected to be originated from Indonesia as the island's geographical proximity to Weh Island, Aceh. At the same time, the haze was confirmed to have reached the city of Sabang in Weh Island. However, as of 18 October, no authority had confirmed that the haze in Great Nicobar was caused by Indonesia's forest fires.

=== Australia ===
On 25 October, The vast plumes of Carbon Dioxide have reached northern part of Australia. Although a large size of smoke plume from New Guinea wildfires has reached Northern Australia, it didn't have any direct impact on the surface.

== Counter-measures ==
=== Cloud seeding ===
On 3 September, the Sarawak government approved a three-day cloud seeding operation targeting key hydroelectric dams in an effort to increase the potential of heavy rainfall in the targeted areas that recorded hazy and unhealthy air quality levels in Sarawak, and also to subsequently help maintain the availability of the region's water resources. This involves the use of the Royal Malaysian Air Force's C-130, with steel tanks carrying salt solutions.

The problem with the cloud seeding operation in Indonesia is there are no clouds and low visibility.

=== Mitigation of health effects ===
On 16 October 2026, as haze smokes entered Jakarta, Governor Pramono Anung states that he has mobilize 31 hospitals and 44 clinics to anticipate for any health risk may be inflicted after receiving reports from BMKG that haze from Kalimantan may spread south towards Jakarta.

== Impacts ==
=== Cancellations of outdoor activities and events ===
Several outdoor activities and events in Kuching, Samarahan, and Serian have been postponed or delayed due to the ongoing haze season in Sarawak. This including 53rd Sarawak Schools Sports Council (MSS Sarawak) Athletics Championship 2026 which is actually scheduled and take place on August 10 until August 14, but postponed due to unhealthy air quality in Samarahan. Sarawak Education Department (Jabatan Pendidikan Sarawak) also reminded to all district education offices (Pejabat Pendidikan Daerah) and all educational institutions under its purview to take seriously preventive measures to safeguard students and school staff during hot weather and haze conditions.

On 19 August, Deputy Minister in the Sarawak Premier's Department, Datuk Dr. Abdul Rahman Junaidi, said the 2026 Sarawak-level Maulidur Rasul celebration, will be held at Dewan Sentral Sarikei on August 25, which is will feature only a gathering, without a procession due to the unhealthy haze situation and hot weather. This Maulidur Rasul celebration was originally to be scheduled and take place at the Sarikei Sports Complex, but the venue and programme were changed as a precautionary measure.

The Purple Parade, a disability rights movement based in Singapore, postponed its annual march, set for October 24, to the first half of 2027 due to the haze.

=== Closure of schools and education institutions ===
On 12 August, Sarawak government announced a total of 108 schools in Serian area have been closed after the air pollutant index (API) exceeded over 200. Deputy Premier of Sarawak, Datuk Amar Douglas Uggah Embas said this solution was in line with the National Haze Action Plan (Pelan Tindakan Jerebu Kebangsaan), which allowed the immediate closure of all schools, kindergartens and childcare centres once the API breaches 200 and above. At the same time, it is also as the precautionary solutions to protect the safety, health and well-being of all students and school staff in Serian. To ensure the continuous learning for the students, home-based teaching and learning (PdPR) will be implemented during the closure period.

On 20 August, despite the second wave of transboundary haze situation, the deteriorating air quality in Sarawak has prompted the closure of all 591 schools under 10 district education offices across Sarawak, amid growing concerns over the impact of the transboundary haze on pupils and students. Sarawak Education Department said in a statement yesterday that the closures involved 509 primary schools with a combined enrolment of 107,590 pupils, as well as 82 secondary schools involving 89,733 students. The affected schools fall under the Kuching, Padawan, Bau, Lundu, Samarahan, Simunjan, Serian, Sri Aman, Lubok Antu and Betong district education offices.

In Indonesia, dozens of schools in Pontianak were closed on 11 August, due to the spreading haze caused from the wildfires and open burning activities in West Kalimantan and Central Kalimantan. The mayor of Pontianak, Edi Rusdi Kamtono, ordered all schools should be closed due to the smoke wafting over the city from fires elsewhere.

On 7 October, the government of Johor announced that all schools in the state will be closed for the next two days due to the worsening air quality. The school closures were extended to 16 October as projected wind movements from 13 to 15 October would bring poor air quality to Johor.

On October 14, the government of Timor-Leste shut down schools nationwide between 15 and 17 October.

=== Impact on sports ===
On 1 September 2026, a 2026–27 Malaysia FA Cup home fixture between DPMM FC and Terengganu FC on this date was postponed due to the worsening conditions. The annual cycling event, Lekas Highway Ride, originally scheduled for 12 September 2026 was postponed due to the haze.

Due to the haze, the half-marathon of Decathlon's inaugural Kiprun race on 27 September in Singapore was shortened from the standard 21.1 kilometres (13.1 mi) to 10 kilometres (6.2 mi), though distances for the other formats stayed the same, with the awards ceremony being cancelled and all categories becoming non-competitive.

The Formula One (F1) races in Sepang and Singapore held in October 2026 were affected by the haze. Despite the haze, most fans and drivers were largely unbothered by the haze and continued to attend the races anyway, with no significant impact on business operations. On 8 October, the Fédération Internationale de l'Automobile (FIA) announced that outdoor activity at the Singapore Grand Prix such as entertainment may be restricted should the haze worsen, though the race itself would remain unaffected as the haze was not deemed severe enough to affect outdoor events such as the race. Contingency plans, including the availability of N95 masks, were set up by the Singapore Tourism Board. Williams Racing driver Carlos Sainz Jr. noted that there was dilemma for race drivers to continue with the racing event despite the worsening air conditions but will go on based on information given by local authorities. He further commented that the haze won't be affecting much towards drivers' performance since they got used to inhale exhaust fumes from cars ahead of them. The MotoGP race held in Indonesia was also similarly affected by the haze, with local track operations at Mandalika working quickly to ensure track operations were undisrupted.

Local sports in Singapore have been impacted by the haze, with matches being cancelled or rescheduled. The Singapore FA Cup final held at the Jurong East Stadium was postponed as the PSI in the Western region, where the stadium was located in, was more than 200. Other events were cancelled or postponed as well.

== Responses ==
=== Domestic and international response ===
Former Governor of Jakarta and 2024 presidential candidate Anies Baswedan teased the government of Indonesia as fires spread into neighbouring countries. As previously during the campaign, Anies debated that "the wind doesn't have an ID card" when asked about air pollution in Jakarta, for which he was ridiculed by Prabowo Subianto. As conditions became worse, Anies' words were vindicated and he fired another statement, "the wind doesn't have a passport". While in Singapore, Anies demanded the government to act firm and swiftly to end the haze while warns not to consider the haze as a seasonal issue, stating "don't let our people slowly died because of the smoke". Forestry minister Raja Juli Antoni uses a similar quote that got Anies Baswedan ridiculed during the 2024 election regarding to the haze and claimed that Malaysia also send haze to Indonesia. His perceived incompetence in handling the haze lead to calls for his resignation from members of the Fourth Commission of the House of Representatives of Indonesia.

Prime Minister of Malaysia Anwar Ibrahim and Sultan of Brunei Hassanal Bolkiah jointly agreed to bring up the issue towards ASEAN. Former Malaysian health minister Khairy Jamaluddin labelled Indonesia a "banana republic" and a "proper third-world country" criticising the country for failing to take proper action following repeated crises since 1990. Lim Guan Eng (PH-Bagan) called for legal action against Indonesia should Indonesia refuses to cooperate. Countering calls to take action, Mohamad Hasan (BN-Rembau) said that Malaysia will not send any diplomatic protest nor taking legal actions stating that it will worsen diplomatic ties. Singaporean prime minister Lawrence Wong decided to enforce the Transboundary Haze Pollution Act to take action into the perpetrators responsible for haze. Many Indonesians welcomed any efforts of foreign governments to exert pressure on Prabowo for not having their voices heard, criticizing the government's lack of response and misappropriating funds to controversial government programs such as the troubled free nutritious meals (MBG) program.

After a trilateral summit with Indonesian defence minister Sjafrie Sjamsoeddin and Australian deputy prime minister Richard Marles, Japanese defence minister Shinjirō Koizumi announced that Japan will dispatch JS Kunisaki along with 3 JGSDF CH-47 heavy transport helicopters to aid firefighting efforts in Indonesia. Kunisaki along with the helicopters arrived on September 16 and conducted firefighting missions up to September 29, to which Koizumi ended the mission after Indonesia requested that they are confident to conduct firefighting missions on their own.

On disaster-response assets, Dr Ahmad Zahid Hamidi (BN-Bagan Datuk) said the meeting also agreed that NADMA would take over the procurement of disaster-related assets for use by enforcement agencies including the Royal Malaysia Police (PDRM), Fire and Rescue Department of Malaysia (JBPM) and Civil Defence Force (APM). This was to ensure sufficient assets, such as boats and heavy vehicles, were available to deal with disasters, thereby strengthening the country's disaster preparedness. While meeting President Prabowo Subianto on 18 September 2026, Zahid announced that Malaysia will send 1 plane, 3 helicopters and 52 personnel to assist with firefighting efforts to which Prabowo accepted. However, as of 11 October, the Malaysian government states that they have yet to see a response from their Indonesian counterparts. On October 15, Foreign Minister Arrmanatha Nasir announced that Indonesia approves foreign aid to tackle the worsening haze. For opening foreign aid, Zahid expresses his gratitude for Prabowo's openness while Shanmugam appreciates and expresses that Singapore will do their part to support.

Despite criticisms both at home and abroad, most Indonesian officials downplayed the impact of the haze. Central Kalimantan Governor Agustiar Sabran states that he will not request the government to declare it as a national emergency because his community can still resume activities in a normal manner. Mayor of Palembang Ratu Dewa states he can still enjoy normal activities despite residents choking over the haze. Ria Norsan from West Kalimantan while facing protests from student volunteers mockingly asked if said students gave their efforts to fight the fires despite students said they tried while not having enough water. East Kalimantan governor Rudy Mas'ud came under heavy criticism for having been spotted in Singapore apparently for a medical checkup and not back in his province trying to solve the wildfire situation. In response to calls to declare the haze as a national emergency, Coordinating Minister for Political and Security Affairs Dudung Abdurachman said that the government refuses to declare as such because they viewed the haze can still be managed on their own.

Some Indonesian leaders also made effort to call for the government to tackle the haze or at least acted to mitigate forest fires. North Kalimantan governor Zainal Arifin Paliwang went on site to fight the fires together with other officials, encouraging them to not giving up despite lacking the necessary equipment. His effort gained positive reactions as the other governors in Kalimantan came under fire for their reactions to the haze. Member of parliament Daniel Johan (PKB-West Kalimantan I) demanded for those responsible for planting palm seeds in areas ravaged by the fires to be persecuted while have the previously burnt forest to be replanted with hard and productive trees. Johan also demanded for the government to act seriously by declaring the haze as a national emergency due to the severity of the disaster as it has become an international disaster.

==== Rising tensions ====
As Malaysia and Singapore requested Indonesia to immediately conduct firefighting operations, DPR RI member Marwan Dasopang (PKB-North Sumatra II) instead criticised both countries for not contributing because there were Malaysian and Singaporean palm oil companies operating and told both countries to "not just protest". Marwan's comments were further backed up by Greenpeace where their investigations found that Malaysian and Singaporean firms are contributing to the haze itself. Contrary to the investigations done by Greenpeace, communications minister Fahmi Fadzil (PH-Lembah Pantai) declared that no Malaysian firms were involved through checks conducted by plantation and commodities minister Noraini Ahmad (BN-Parit Sulong). Indonesian police chief Suyudi Ario Seto on 19 October announced that Polri has probed around 98 cases involving firms linked to the haze and declared that there is foreign involvement especially from neighbouring countries. But he has yet to disclose which country or companies involved as Seto states evidences are still being gathered and classified.

Head of Government Communications Agency Syahganda Nainggolan on 10 October when questioned by media in a National Resilience Institute office in Jakarta about Malaysian and Singaporean governments' displeasure with the haze said in response that the haze was "a natural phenomenon" and Indonesian forests "contributed oxygen" to both countries while asking those countries to "understand the situation". This statement received significant criticism from the Malaysian and Singaporean public, as well as some governmental officials such as Singapore's Minister for Home Affairs K. Shanmugam who described the haze as "preventable" . Malaysian MP Kalam Salan (PN-Sabak Bernam) read an Javanese open letter statement addressed to President Prabowo Subianto "who might not understand Malay" in a 21 October Dewan Rakyat session not only urging the president for immediate action stopping the haze but also reprimanding the "oxygen contribution" statement.

Meanwhile, in a parliamentary session, Syed Saddiq (MUDA-Muar) calls for ASEAN to issue a harsh diplomatic protest to Indonesia and treat Indonesia as an outcast for failing to mitigate the fires. He also urged for boycotts on Indonesian products and to cut-off any financial access to Indonesian firms using Malaysian or Singaporean banking services. If Malaysian companies were also found to be complicit on the haze raging in Indonesia, Saddiq said the Malaysian government must also take action against their own if found guilty, stating that Malaysia shouldn't be hypocrites for not doing so. He proposes that Malaysian and Singaporean banking institutions to block any companies found guilty on slash-and-burn tactics used. Saddiq's call for boycott is heavily condemned by former minister of trade Muhammad Lutfi who perceived Saddiq's call for boycott as an attack on Indonesia's honor and asked Saddiq to "look at the mirror" before talking about sanctions. Firman Soebagyo (Golkar-Central Java III) called Syed Saddiq a hypocrite for not seeing that Malaysian firms also contributed to the haze. Home affairs minister Tito Karnavian however stated his indifference towards Saddiq's statements as long as financial pressures applied are conducted based on applicable provisions of the law. Responding to angry comments from Indonesia, Syed Saddiq fired back at Lufti's statement saying that it is not about Malaysia against Indonesia despite calling for boycotts in the parliament prior to his clarification. Saddiq also requested for any Malaysian, Singaporean or Indonesian firms involved in the haze to be judged fairly under Indonesian law without relying on nationalist sentiment, stating that flags may be different but the victims are shared together.

Several Malaysians heeded to Syed Saddiq's calls for boycotts and engaged in a boycott campaign of their own. Although the boycott started after Indonesia won the 2026 FIFA ASEAN Cup much to Malaysia's disappointment, the boycott intensifies after Syahganda Nainggolan's "free oxygen" statement as frustration from Malaysians mounted.

Presidential Advisory Council member Ignasius Jonan fired a criticism towards Malaysia and Singapore for speaking up on the haze after 4 months and suspected that Malaysia and Singapore had a different playbook other than the ASEAN Agreement on Transboundary Haze Pollution. Jonan also criticised Malaysian and Singaporean politicians for criticizing Indonesia to cater in voices of their own constituency and asked both countries to persecute all companies involved in the haze together with Indonesia in a fair and unbiased manner.

In response to her announcement that Singapore has warned 7 Indonesian companies involved in the haze under the Transboundary Haze Pollution Act, Grace Fu was then criticised by former Minister of Trade Muhammad Lutfi who then mentioned that 4 of the listed companies have Singaporean ties based on Greenpeace's investigations and challenged the Singaporean government to raid their offices in Singapore, judge them accordingly to Singaporean law and not to make warnings to Indonesia to make their own constituents happy. Lutfi also questioned Singapore's fairness and quipped that Singapore's decision is made based on the state of their bank accounts, challenging Lawrence Wong and K. Shanmugam to act accordingly. Lutfi was criticised by former Singaporean Nominated Member of Parliament (NMP) Calvin Cheng, who called on Indonesia to take full responsibility for their involvement in the haze situation and asserting that Singapore would remain unmoved by their comments.

President Prabowo Subianto stated that there may be indications that foreign actors are involved in the haze and said Indonesia's sovereignty was being tested. On 21 October, he criticised foreign countries perceived as disrespecting Indonesia while having reports that the same countries are also contributing to the fires and said he would be looking forward to announcing the names when disclosed. Shortly after on 22 October, Energy Minister Bahlil Lahadalia announced that Indonesia would reconsider energy exports to countries that did not respect Indonesia, and subsequently announced on 24 October that Indonesia would reduce pipeline gas supplies to Singapore, citing domestic energy requirements. Singapore Prime Minister Lawrence Wong, in a party conference on 25 October, responded by emphasising the importance of honouring contractual commitments. This statement prompted Bahlil to reject suggestions that Indonesia needed to be lectured on its contractual obligations. Bahlil further alleged that Singapore was re-exporting some of the liquefied natural gas cargo supplied by Indonesia to third countries, even though he has not provided any supporting evidence to support his accusation. In a similar tone, coordinating minister for food Zulkifli Hasan states that foreign countries who still mocked and ridiculed Indonesia for the handling of the haze must show respect to Indonesian firefighters and Indonesia can also be angry if insults from neighbouring countries are still lodged.

Foreign minister Vivian Balakrishnan visited Indonesia on 27 October to meet with Arrmanatha Nasir amidst of mounting tensions and diplomatic spats between Indonesian and Singaporean officials. In an attempt to cool tensions down, Nasir made an acknowledgement that the first and foremost victims of the haze are Indonesians and explained that fighting the haze has been made a national priority by Prabowo along with the methods. Balakrishnan agreed to Nasir's acknowledgement and stating solidarity but reminded that despite the El Nino, the haze is a man-made disaster and must be resolved. Both countries agreed to work together on persecuting the perpetrators by sharing information, jointly collect cross-border evidences and potentially recovering assets linked to the companies who started the fires.

Prabowo apologised to Singapore and Malaysia over the transboundary haze from the forest and land fires on 6 November, acknowledging its impact on communities, after the ASEAN Leaders' Summit in Manilla. He also stated that 104 companies would be investigated by the Indonesian government. 71,000 forest firefighters were deployed, of which 16 of them lost their lives. Two helicopters were also lost. Indonesia would also establish a new agency to better prevent future wilefires.

=== Government censorship and intimidation attempts ===
Several Malaysian social media influencers got harassed by pro-government Indonesians who send death threats for criticizing Prabowo's handling over the haze. Similarly, Indonesian streamer Windah Basudara were also harassed by the same group of Indonesians who accused him of being paid by Anies Baswedan or having a political interest to smear the government. Windah states that he has his own "buzzers" who can harass pro-government influencers in response and he doesn't have to pay them unlike the government. Another Indonesian influencer reveals that he was contacted by the government to engage in a social campaign where he was not allowed to discuss about the haze and offered Rp.80 million for doing so, leading to debates on transparency and attack of free speech in Indonesia.

Several internet users in Indonesia has reported a shadow ban attempt by the government against their social media account. Social media influencer Tasya Farasya and Ustadz Adi Hidayat were among the influential people who spoke about the shadow banning of their Instagram accounts. The Ministry of Communication and Digital Affairs denied their role in censorship of wildfire related issues and stated that different social media have different community standards and assure the government is open to criticism and suggestions from the people.

=== Sanctions against forest fire perpetrators ===
Indonesian President Prabowo Subianto has called for very strict regulations and sanctions against slash-and-burn land clearances, branding the practice as "ecological terrorism", as the country struggles to contain wildfires that have been raging for weeks. Indonesia is battling its most intense wildfires in 11 years, with "Super El Nino" weather conditions parching the country's forests and fields.

The islands of Borneo and Sumatra have been the worst hit, with the hazardous haze causing a spike in respiratory illnesses. Transboundary pollution has also caused unhealthy air conditions in neighbouring countries including Singapore and Malaysia. During a meeting with his government cabinet, Prabowo said there will be zero tolerance for people or corporations found responsible for starting wildfires. He also instructed more regional governments to immediately abolish exemptions that allow smallholders to clear small plots of land using fire.

Prabowo also called for the police to launch criminal investigations against corporations found to be violating fire safeguards. Following Prabowo's remarks, Indonesian police official Mohammad Irhamni told reporters on September 17 that police have launched 219 criminal investigations linked to the fires, with 162 people named as suspects so far. He added that the police were also investigating 95 companies, but he did not disclose how many of them are suspected of criminal offences.

On 14 October, the Indonesian Police named 223 people and nine companies as those responsible for causing forest and land fires, with over 5,150 hectares (12,700 acres) of land area being burnt.

On 15 October, Singapore's Prime Minister Lawrence Wong said that they are checking if some companies were responsible for haze-causing fires under the Transboundary Haze Pollution Act. On 16 October, Singapore would send legal notices containing preventive notices to seven companies, which were responsible for starting fires that caused the haze under the Act. Some lawyers noted that the legal action may implicate diplomatic relationships. On the same day, Minister Grace Fu announced that Singapore has issued warnings to 7 Indonesian companies involved in the haze under the Transboundary Haze Pollution Act. The seven companies are as follows:

- PT. Bumi Andalas Permai
- PT. Bumi Mekar Hijau
- PT. Paramitra Mulia Langgeng
- PT. Sumatera Alam Anugerah
- PT. SBA Wood Industries
- PT. Hutan Lestari Raya
- PT. Bangkanesia

On 19 October, Shanmugam announced that the Singapore Exchange has launched investigations on seven locally listed agriculture companies with possible links to the fires in Indonesia for questioning. The seven companies are as follows:

- Golden Agri-Resources
- Bumitama Agri
- First Resources
- Wilmar International
- Kencana Agri
- Indofood Agri Resources
- TSH Resources

In addition, the government of Singapore would also look into Asia Pulp & Paper which was incorporated in Singapore and First Borneo Plantations which has ownership links to Singaporean-incorporated companies.

=== Indonesia-Singapore Cooperation on Transboundary Haze ===
In October and November 2026, Indonesia and Singapore announced two initiatives to strengthen cooperation in addressing transboundary haze caused by forest and land fires in Indonesia: the establishment of a bilateral task force; and the development of the ASEAN Coordinating Center for Transboundary Haze Pollution Control in Indonesia.

==== Indonesia-Singapore Bilateral Task Force ====
On 27 October, Indonesian Foreign Minister Arrmanatha Nasir and Singapore Foreign Minister Vivian Balakrishnan agreed to establish a bilateral task force to investigate companies suspected of involvement in illegal land burning. The cooperation would include information sharing, tracing financial transactions and cross-border corporate relationships, and strengthening law enforcement. The initiative would complement Indonesia's existing enforcement efforts, which had resulted in legal action against hundreds of individuals and more than 50 companies, while Singpore had issued preventive notices to 10 companies.

==== ASEAN Coordinating Center for Transboundary Haze Pollution Control ====
On 3 November 2026, Singapore's Minister for Sustainability and the Environment, Grace Fu, announced plans to advance the establishment of the ASEAN Coordinating Center for Transboundary Haze Pollution Control in Indonesia during Singapore's ASEAN Chairmanship term in 2027. The center aims to strengthen regional coordination in preventing and combating forest fires, including information sharing, technology exchange and emergency assistance. The establishment of the center would require ratification of the agreement by at least 6 ASEAN member states.

== See also ==
- 2006 Southeast Asian Haze
- 2013 Southeast Asian Haze
- 2019 Southeast Asian Haze
