= 1997 Southeast Asian haze =

Haze over the Southeast Asia region in mid-1997

Coordinates: 3°S 105°E

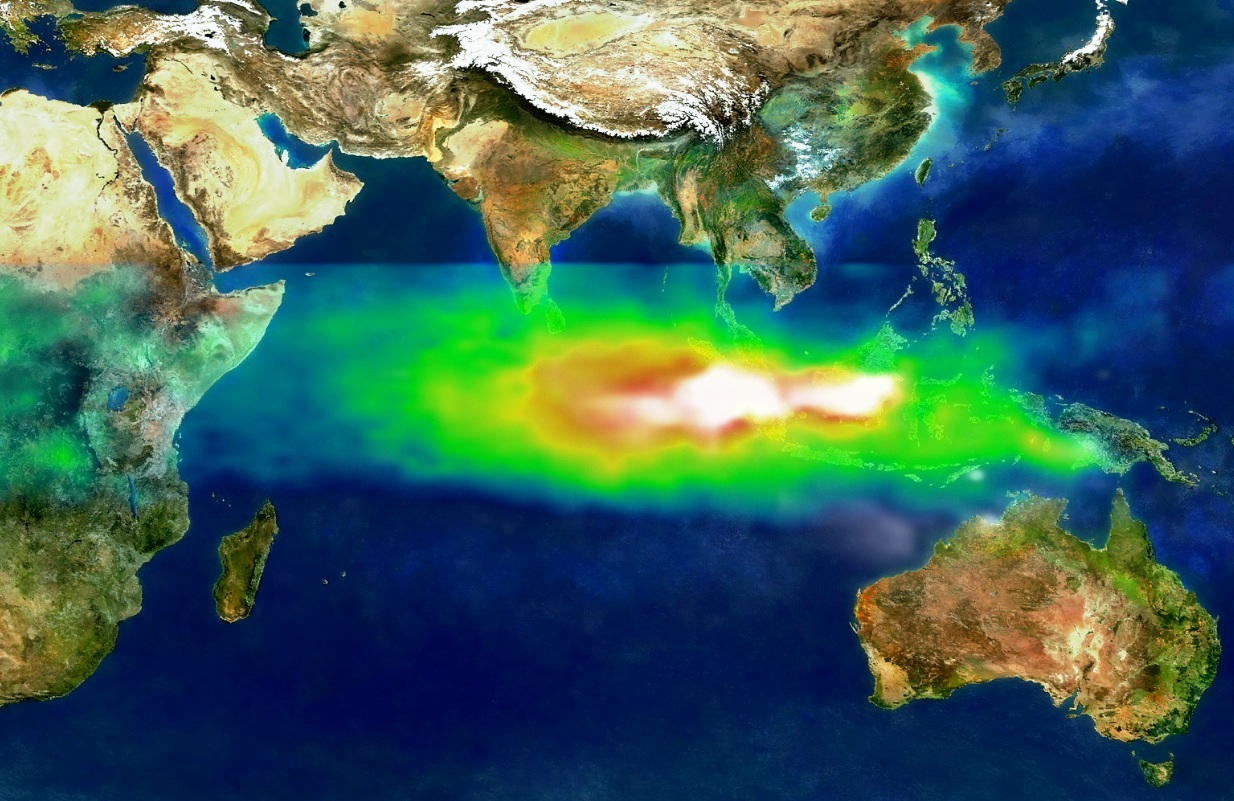
Air pollution over Southeast Asia in October 1997

The 1997 Southeast Asian haze was an international air pollution disaster that occurred during the second half of 1997, its after-effects causing widespread atmospheric visibility and health problems within Southeast Asia. Considered the most severe Southeast Asian haze event of all time, the total costs of the 1997 haze are estimated at US$9 billion, due mainly to health care and disruption of air travel and business activities.

The influence of the 1997 fires in Kalimantan and Sumatra on ambient air quality was evident by July and peaked in September/October before weakening by November, when the delayed monsoonal rain extinguished the fires and improved air quality within the region. During the peak episode, satellite imagery (NASA/TOMS aerosol index maps) showed a haze layer that expanded over an area of more than 3,000,000 km^{2} (1,200,000 sq mi), covering large parts of Sumatra and Kalimantan. Its northward extension partially reached Malaysia, Singapore, Brunei, Thailand and the Philippines and its westward extension reached Sri Lanka. During this period, particulate matter concentrations frequently exceeded national ambient air quality standards. Monthly mean horizontal visibility at most locations in Sumatra and Kalimantan in September was below 1 km (0.62 mi) and daily maximum visibility was frequently below 100 metres (330 ft).

== Countries affected ==
- Indonesia
- Singapore
- Malaysia
- Thailand
- Brunei
- Philippines
- Sri Lanka

== Causes ==
The 1997 Southeast Asian haze was caused mainly by slash-and-burn techniques adopted by farmers in Indonesia. Slash and burn has been extensively used for many years as the cheapest and easiest means to clear the lands for traditional agriculture. Fire is also used during the long fallow rotation of the so-called jungle rubber in Sumatra and Kalimantan to remove most of the biomass, including the woody parts before new plantations are re-established.

Fire may also be deliberately used as a weapon to claim property on the islands and provinces where land ownership is not clear, an action taken by both smallholders and large operators alike. After burning out its previous owner, the smallholder or large operator plants their own crops there, gaining de facto control over the disputed land.

During the dry season, dry fuels readily ignite and lead to large wildfires, and due to the 1997–98 El Niño event, the dry season in Southeast Asia was even drier than normal. These accidental fires may have the same underlying socio-economic and institutional problems. In cases like this, fire suppression can be very difficult and costly especially when they reach the highly flammable peat-swamp areas.

== Effects ==
Atmospheric particulate matter was the form of air pollutant that predominantly contributed to the haze and degradation in ambient air quality standards during this crisis. In all countries affected by the smoke haze, an increase of acute health outcomes was observed. Health effects; included emergency room visits due to respiratory symptoms such as asthma, upper respiratory infection, decreased lung function as well as eye and skin irritation, were caused mainly by this particulate matter. In Singapore, for instance, health surveillance showed a 30% increase in hospital attendance due to air quality related symptoms. Generally, children and the elderly, as well as those with pre-existing respiratory and cardiac diseases were the most susceptible to adverse health outcomes from the haze exposure. The smoke haze episode has added to the urban and industrial air pollution in Southeast Asia, causing it to reach alarming levels in many metropolitan areas.

By scattering and absorbing light, the fire-related particulate also resulted in reduced visibility; impairing transportation by air, land and water and seriously affecting the economies of Indonesia, Malaysia and Singapore. Among the economic sectors affected most were air, land and sea transportation, construction, tourism and agricultural industries. EEPSEA/WWF estimated the economic value of the damages caused by the 1997 fires and haze. They estimated one billion US$ from haze-related damages for Indonesia only. The damages to Malaysia and Singapore are figured at 0.4 billion US$. Including the fire related damages, the total damages are estimated to amount to 4.5 billion US$. However, a variety of the damages such as decreased quality of life, loss of biodiversity and atmospheric impacts are difficult to establish.

Fire-related smoke haze episodes also reveal a social component: a large part of the population in Southeast Asia do not have the financial means to buy protective measures such as respiratory masks and air conditioning, nor are they able to refrain from outdoor work when air pollution is high.

== See also ==
- 2005 Malaysian haze
- 2006 Southeast Asian haze
- 2013 Southeast Asian haze
- 2015 Southeast Asian haze
- 2016 Southeast Asian haze
- 2019 Southeast Asian haze
- 2026 Southeast Asian haze
- Air quality index
- Asian brown cloud
- Borneo peat swamp forests
- Deforestation in Borneo
- Haze
- Pollutant Standards Index
- Slash and burn
- Southeast Asian haze
- Garuda Indonesia Flight 152
