= 2009 Southeast Asian haze =

Haze over the Southeast Asia region in mid-2009

The 2009 Southeast Asian haze was an episode of large scale air pollution primarily caused by slash and burn practices used to clear land for agricultural purposes in Sumatra, Indonesia. It affected the areas surrounding the Straits of Malacca which besides Indonesia include Malaysia and Singapore.

The haze began in early June 2009 and progressively became worse toward July. With a prevailing dry season caused by El Nino, burning and hence the haze was expected to continue until August or September when the monsoon season arrived.

== Malaysia ==
=== Air Pollution Index ===
Daily average API readings in June 2009
Date	George Town	Kuala Lumpur	Malacca Town	Johor Bahru	Kuantan	Kuching
1	Unavailable	57	51	41	65	29
2	40	73	52	46	41	39
3	31	73	47	38	43	27
4	39	46	31	33	44	35
5	34	44	45	34	41	35
6	40	40	47	47	43	28
7	58	76	51	40	39	28
8	30	67	60	54	47	36
9	28	98	56	56	52	31
10	37	67	58	52	53	45
11	40	69	65	45	48	30
12	35	108	63	55	41	28
13	30	80	44	41	46	51
14	20	64	53	51	47	31
15	20	56	40	40	38	37
16	34	51	42	48	49	22
17	44	61	53	42	44	34
18	55	58	49	36	44	39
19	62	51	49	59	42	46
20	68	61	47	41	42	36

0-50 Good 51-100 Moderate 101-200 Unhealthy 201-300 Very unhealthy 301- Hazardous

== See also ==
- 2006 Southeast Asian haze
- 2013 Southeast Asian haze
- 2015 Southeast Asian haze
- ASEAN Agreement on Transboundary Haze Pollution
