= ASEAN Agreement on Transboundary Haze Pollution =

ASEAN environment agreement

- Type: Environmental protocol
- Signed: 2002
- Signatories: All ASEAN member states
- Depositary: Secretary General of ASEAN
- Language: English

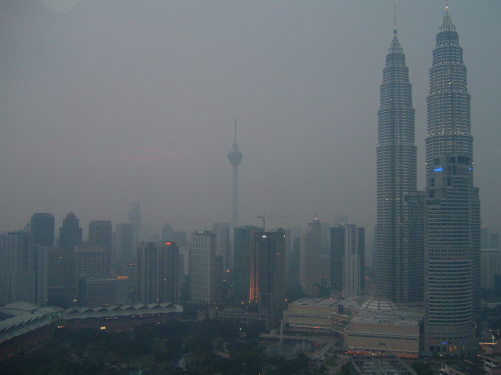
The business district of Kuala Lumpur in the evening of 29 September 2006. Menara Kuala Lumpur was barely visible.

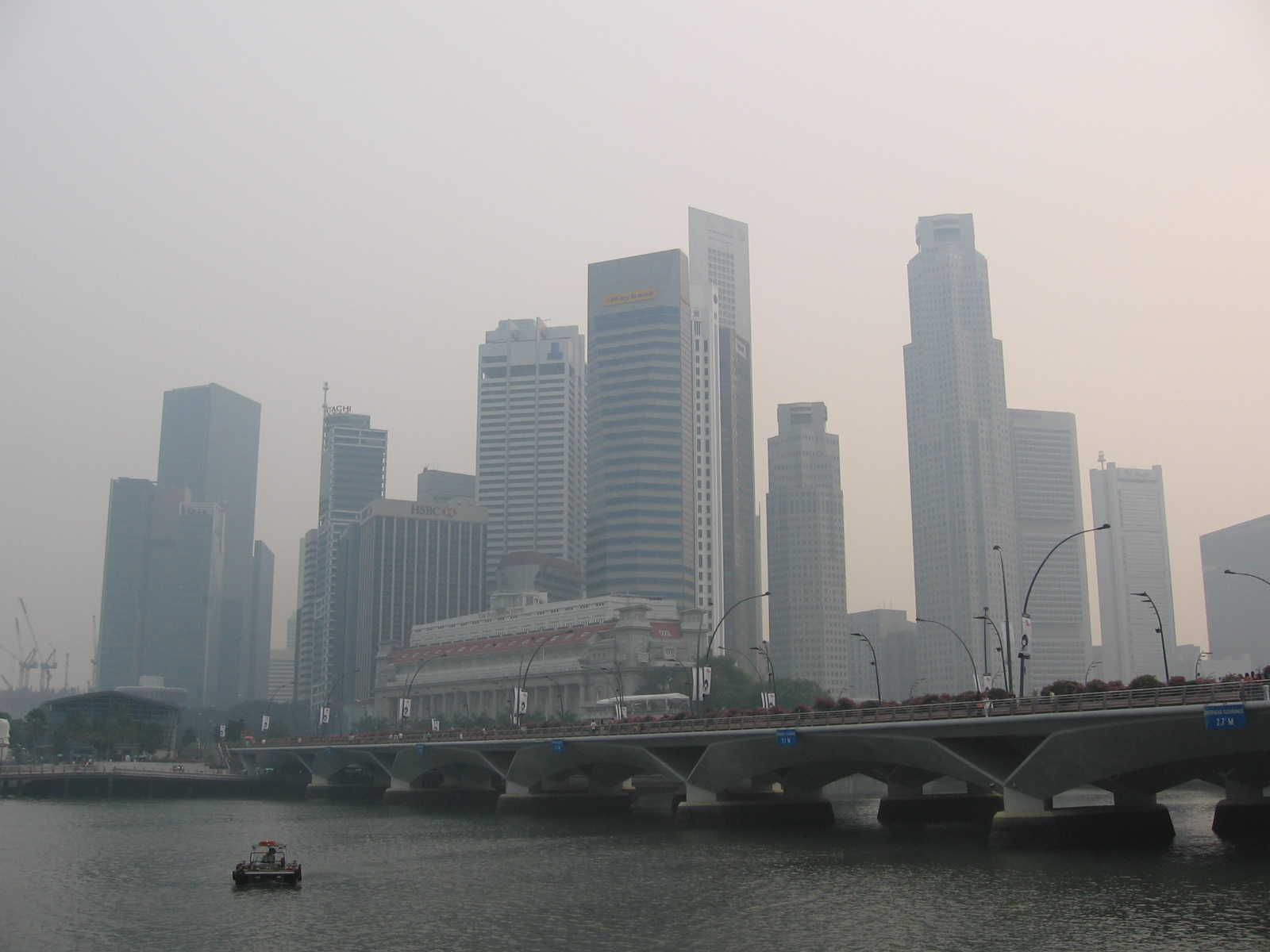
Singapore's Downtown Core on 7 October 2006, when it was affected by forest fires in Sumatra, Indonesia

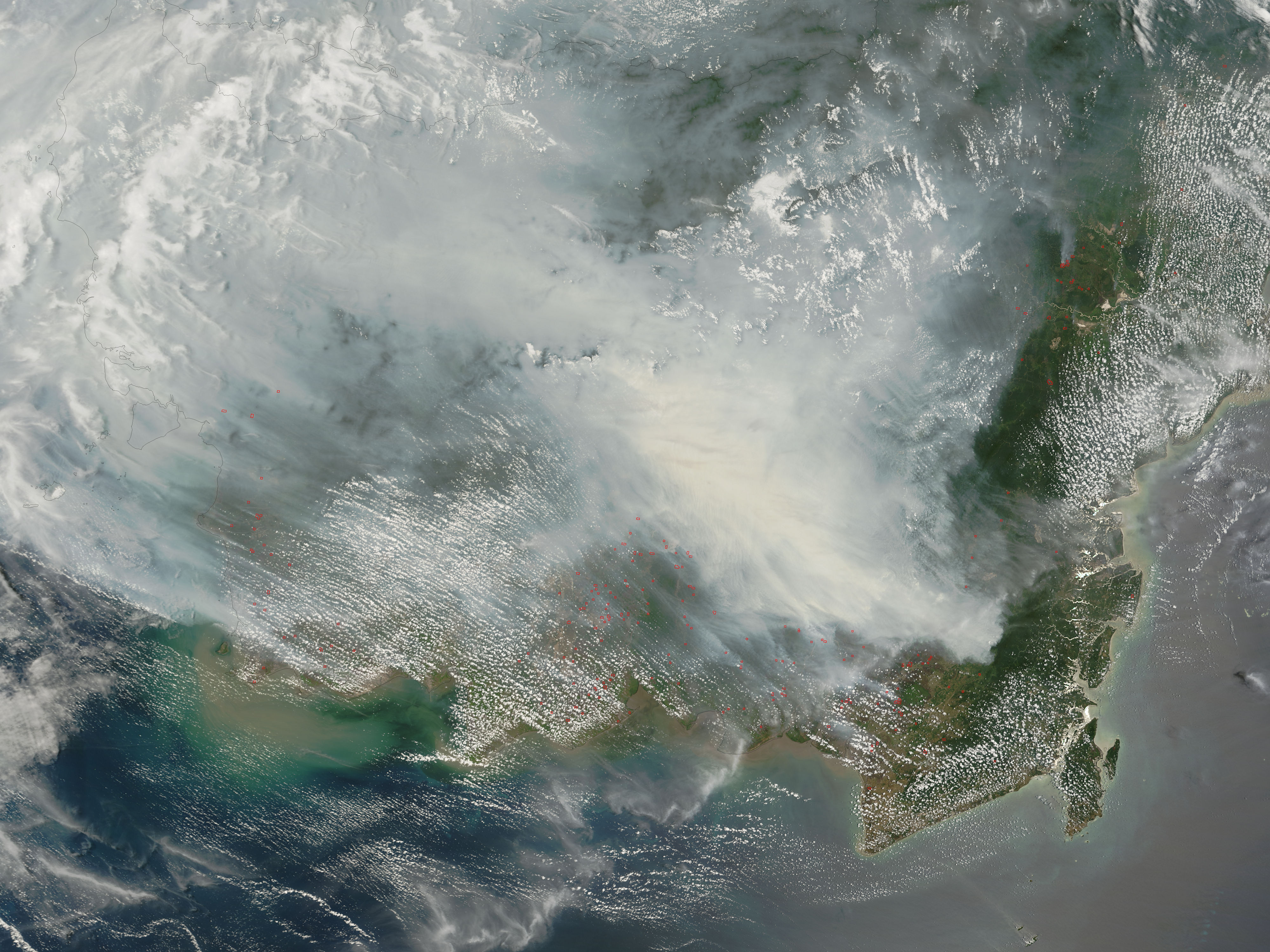
Satellite photograph of the 2006 haze above Borneo

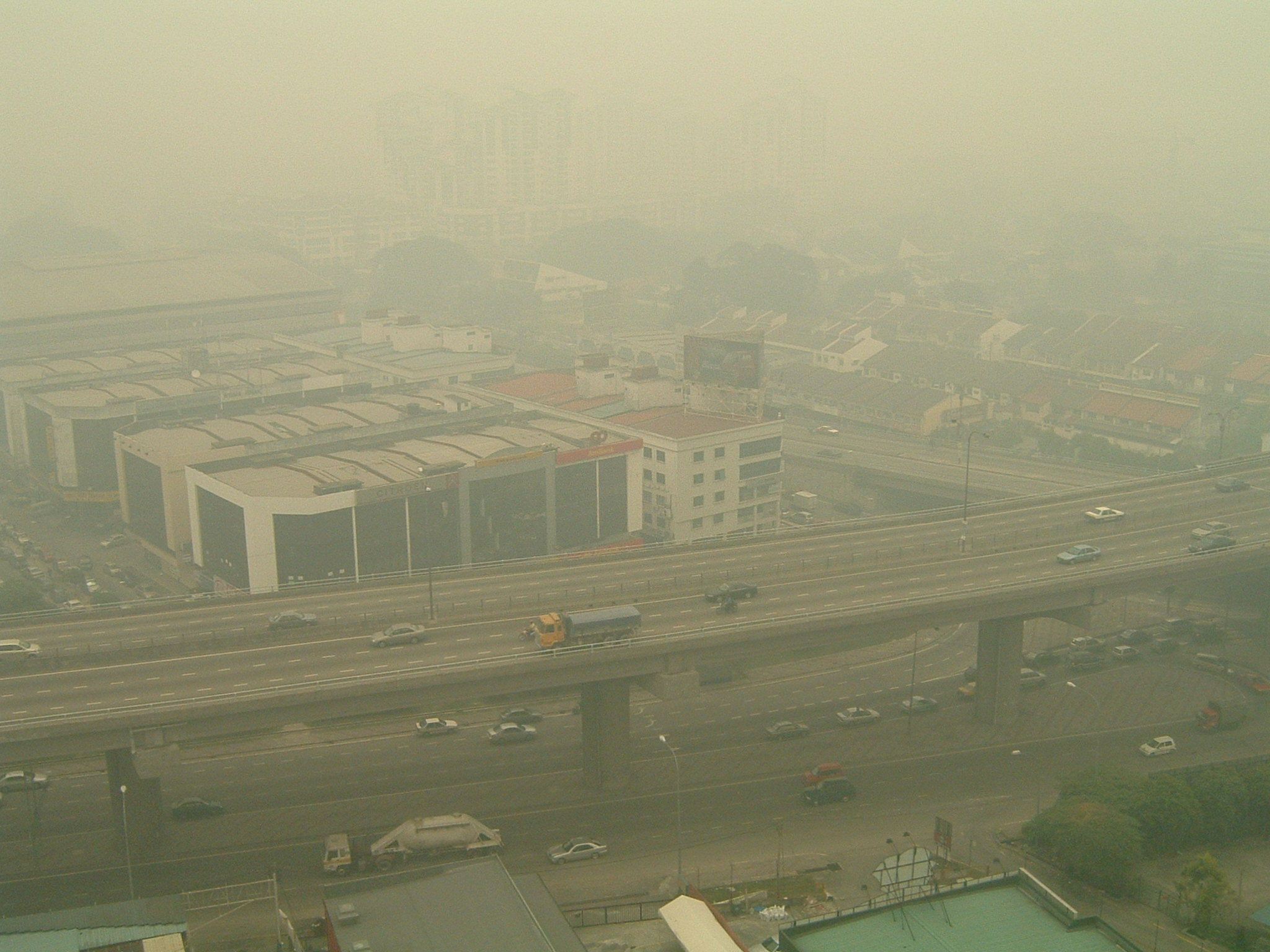
Severe haze affecting Ampang, Kuala Lumpur, Malaysia, in August 2005

The ASEAN Agreement on Transboundary Haze Pollution is a legally binding environmental agreement signed in 2002 by the member states of the Association of Southeast Asian Nations to reduce haze pollution in Southeast Asia. The Agreement recognises that transboundary haze pollution which results from land and/or forest fires should be mitigated through concerted national efforts and international co-operation.

As of September 2014, all ten ASEAN countries have ratified the haze agreement.

== History ==
The agreement is a reaction to an environmental crisis that hit Southeast Asia in the late 1990s. The crisis was mainly caused by land clearing for agricultural uses via open burning on the Indonesian island of Sumatra. Satellite images confirmed the presence of hot spots throughout Kalimantan/Borneo, Sumatra, the Malay Peninsula and several other places, with an estimated 45,000 square kilometres of forest and land burnt. Malaysia, Singapore and, to a certain extent, Thailand and Brunei were particularly badly affected.

The haze is nearly an annual occurrence in some ASEAN nations. Dangerous levels of haze usually coincide with the dry season from June to September when the southwest monsoon is in progress. Southwest monsoon winds shift the haze from Sumatra, Indonesia towards the Malay Peninsula and Singapore, sometimes creating a thick haze that can last for weeks.

=== Negotiation history ===
The agreement was established in 2002, though has some foundation in a 1990 agreement made among ASEAN Ministers of Environment which called for efforts leading to the harmonisation of transboundary pollution prevention and abatement practices.

The treaty also builds on the 1995 ASEAN Cooperation Plan on Transboundary Pollution and the 1997 Regional Haze Action Plan. This treaty is an attempt to bring the action plan into function.

== Parties to the agreement ==
Member state	Date of ratification/approval	Date of deposit of instrument of ratification/approval with the Secretary-General of ASEAN
Malaysia	3 December 2002	18 February 2003
Singapore	13 January 2003	14 January 2003
Brunei	27 February 2003	23 April 2003
Myanmar	5 March 2003	17 March 2003
Vietnam	24 March 2003	29 May 2003
Thailand	10 September 2003	26 September 2003
Laos	19 December 2004	13 July 2005
Cambodia	24 April 2006	9 November 2006
Philippines	1 February 2010	4 March 2010
Indonesia	16 September 2014	20 January 2015

== Institutional structure ==
The agreement is managed by the Ministers of Environment and other representatives from the respective ASEAN countries. Meetings are coordinated under the ASEAN Socio-Cultural Community Council (ASCC), one of three councils, subsidiary to the ASEAN summit and its chair.

== Activities ==
The treaty calls for haze to be mitigated through concerted national efforts and intensified regional and international co-operation in the context of sustainable development. This is to be done through monitoring and prevention activities.

== Protocols ==
The official procedure or system of rules that informs this agreement is the 'ASEAN Way' set of region norms and codes of diplomatic conduct characterised by principles of non-interference, consultation, consensus, quiet diplomacy, symbolism, and organisational minimalism.

== Achievements ==
In October 2013 ASEAN leaders approved a joint haze monitoring system at a cost of US$100,000. Additionally, Singapore has offered to start working directly with Indonesian farmers to encourage sustainable practices and minimise the problem over time by "tackling the haze issue at its root". Singapore has worked with farmers in this way in Indonesia's Jambi province in the past.

== Shortcomings ==
Indonesia, as the primary haze producing party to the problem, was the last ASEAN country to ratify the agreement in 2014, 12 years after it was first signed in 2002. Concerns remain over the ability of the Indonesian government to monitor and effect changes to the problem.

The treaty did not prevent the annual return of the haze between 2004 and 2010, and again in 2013, 2014 and 2015. Recently Indonesia has ranked among the world's largest greenhouse gas emitters, with an estimated 75% of its emissions stemming from deforestation.

== Key debates in literature and policy community ==
The 'haze treaty' is accused of being vague and lacking enforcement mechanisms or strong instruments for dispute-resolution. However, ASEAN has made attempts to depart from its institutional culture in attempt to achieve deeper co-operation on this issue. This is evident in that this is a legally binding treaty, something ASEAN has vehemently opposed in the past.

The treaty is ill-served by the ASEAN style of regional engagement which adamantly protects national sovereignty. The result is that states are compelled to act in their own self-interest rather than regional interests. Additionally, the close relationships between key economic actors and political elites have meant maintenance of the status quo.

In 2014, Singapore enacted the Transboundary Haze Pollution Act to penalise emissions that cause harm across national boundaries.

== See also ==
- 2005 Malaysian haze
- 2006 Southeast Asian haze
- 2013 Southeast Asian haze
- 2015 Southeast Asian haze
- 2026 Southeast Asian haze
- Asian brown cloud
- Southeast Asian haze
