= 2026–2027 El Niño event =

Meteorological event

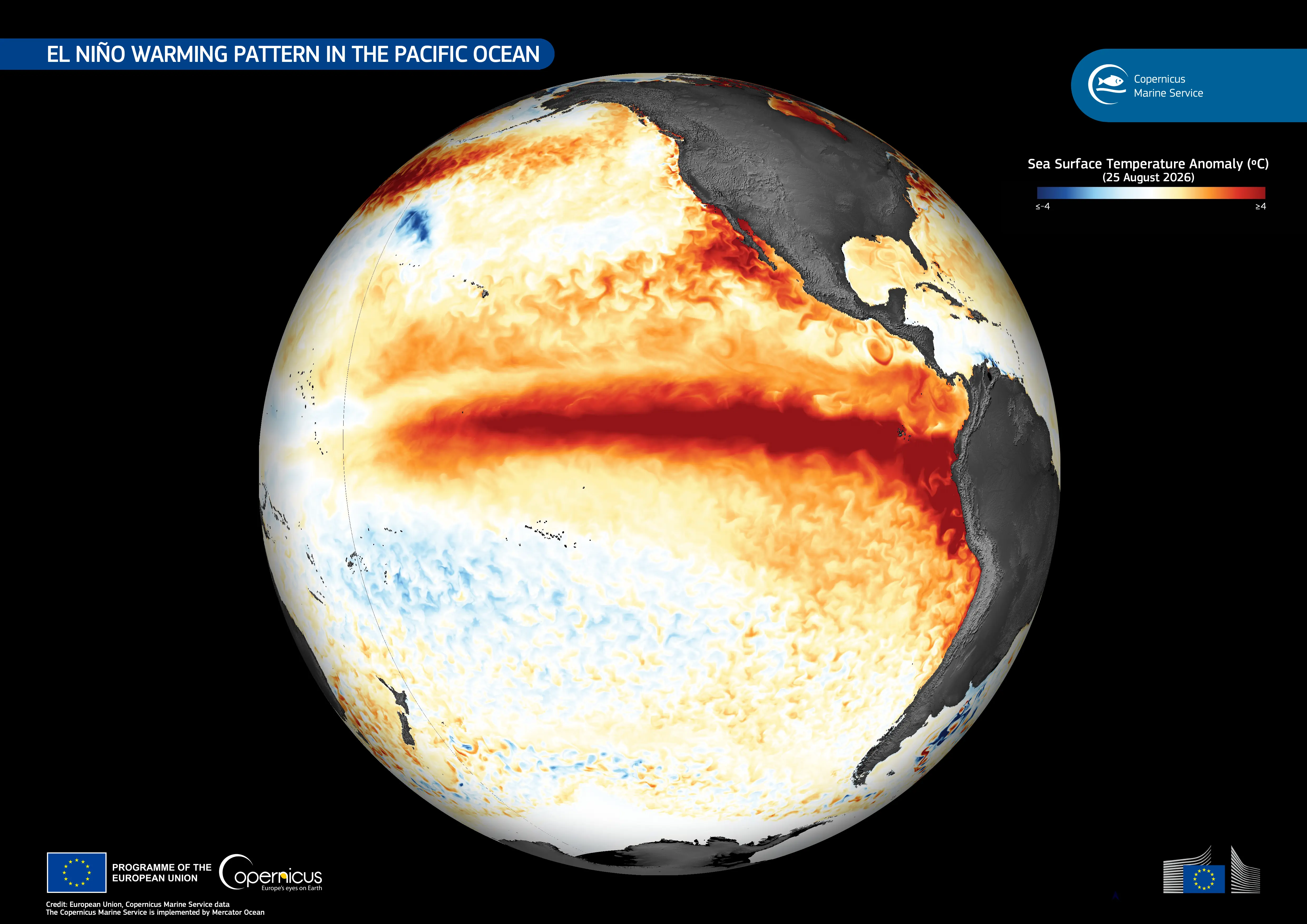
- Data visualisation of sea surface temperature anomalies in the Pacific Ocean in August 2026, during the 2026–2027 El Niño event

Meteorological history
- Formed: June 2026

Overall effects
- Areas affected: The Pacific Ocean, Southern Hemisphere, and Pacific regions of the Northern Hemisphere

The 2026–2027 El Niño is the ongoing El Niño event, with its onset declared on 2 June 2026 by the World Meteorological Organization (WMO). It is the strongest El Niño ever measured for its time of year, and the WMO has reported that it will likely be the strongest El Niño on record, with it already being classified as a "very strong El Niño", also known as a Super El Niño, and rarely called a "Behemoth" El Niño. The 2026–2027 El Niño is expected to peak in November or December and last through early 2027.

== Background ==
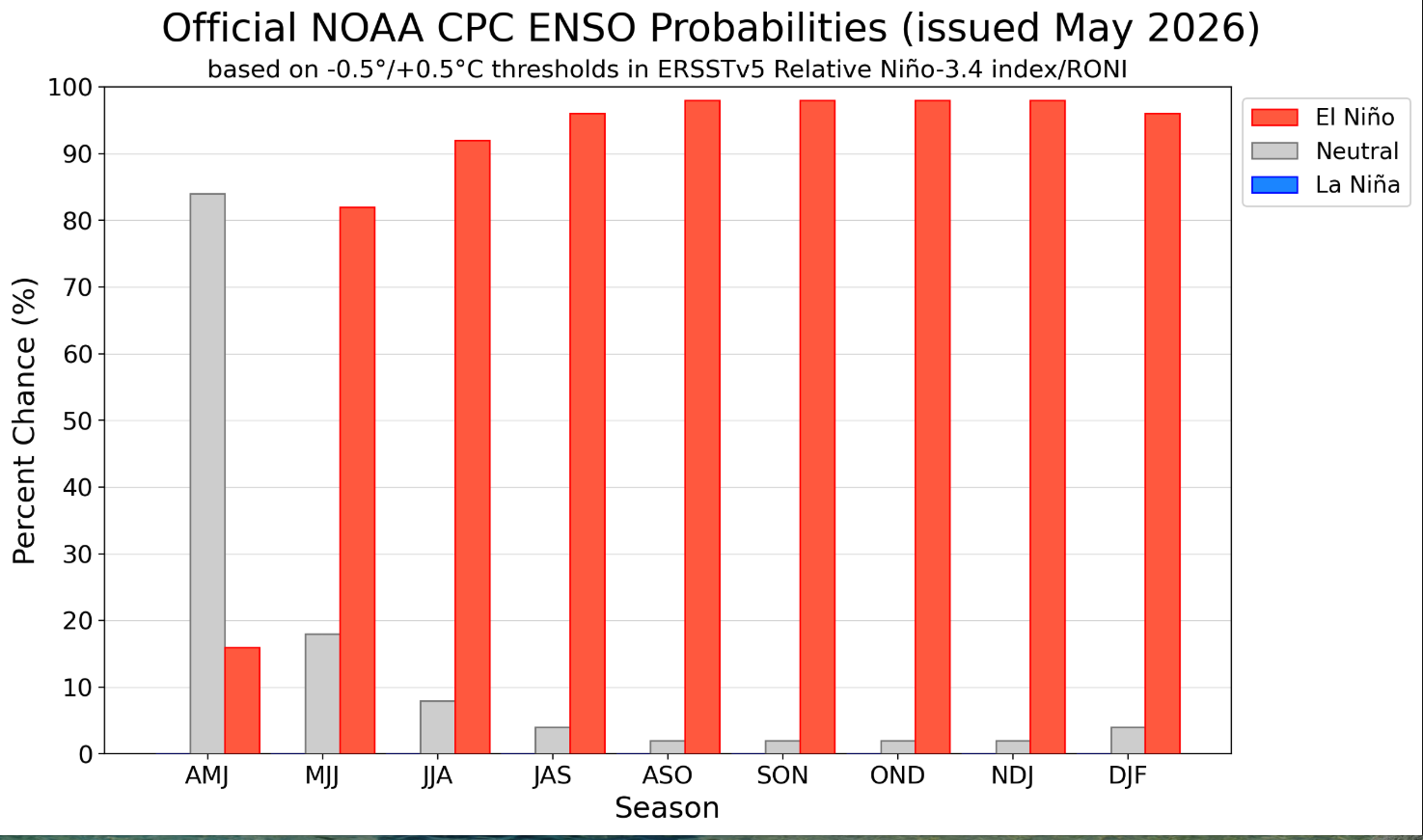
Official NOAA CPC ENSO probabilities as of May 2026

An animation of the evolving El Niño from June 1 to November 10

El Niño is defined as when the Relative Ocean Niño Index (RONI) in the Niño 3.4 region is greater than 0.5 °C for five three-month averaged periods in a row.

A weak La Niña event evolved to ENSO-neutral in early 2026, but was rapidly transitioning to El Niño by May, according to Columbia University's Climate School. Computer modeling in late May by the US National Oceanic and Atmospheric Administration (NOAA) suggested the development of an El Niño event was likely by the July through September peak of the Pacific hurricane season. The Center for Climate Systems Research (CCSR) and the International Research Institute for Climate and Society (IRI) ENSO plume forecast gave a 98% probability of El Niño forming and a 97%-98% probability of continuing through the end of the year, a range Columbia called "remarkably high and narrow".

On 2 June, the United Nations World Meteorological Organization confirmed "that El Niño conditions are developing in the tropical Pacific and are expected to influence weather and climate patterns around the world in the months ahead." The European Centre for Medium-Range Weather Forecasts released a forecast of a central equatorial Pacific Ocean temperature anomaly of 3–4 °C (5.4–7.2 °F), which would make it the strongest on record.

The global average sea surface temperature for June reached an all-time record high of 21.1 °C (70.0 °F). That month, the National Oceanic and Atmospheric Administration (NOAA) confirmed the emergence of a strong El Niño, giving it a 63% chance of becoming intense enough by late fall and early winter to be one of the strongest on record. On 8 October, NOAA stated that there was a greater than 83% chance that it would become the strongest El Niño on record by October-December.

== Timeline ==
Heat storms—generally defined as heat waves of long duration and covering wide areas—have increased in recent decades. Under one definition, heat storms grew from five per year in the 1960s to 102 per year in the 2020s through 2026 when they reached a new high. Spikes in heat waves have often followed within months after El Niño events.

=== April ===
- 20 April – Columbia University's Climate School reports that the weak La Niña event had transitioned into an ENSO-neutral state.

=== May ===
- 21 May – Computer modeling by the US National Oceanic and Atmospheric Administration (NOAA) suggested the development of an El Niño event was likely by the July through September peak of the Pacific hurricane season.

=== June ===
The northern hemisphere summer temperatures in the east-central Pacific are among the highest on record, with NOAA predicting them to exceed those of past powerful El Niños.

- 2 June – The United Nations World Meteorological Organization (WMO) officially confirmed that El Niño conditions are actively developing in the tropical Pacific. This rapid transition follows a remarkably high 97–98% probability forecast from Columbia University's Climate School.
- 11 June – A National Oceanic and Atmospheric Administration notice stated that "El Niño conditions are present and expected to strengthen into the Northern Hemisphere winter 2026-27".

=== August ===
- 5 August – The World Meteorological Organization (WMO) issued a global seasonal update confirming that a developing El Niño event, combined with positive Indian Ocean Dipole conditions and record-warm global sea surface temperatures, is projected to drive above-normal temperatures globally throughout the August–October season.
- 22 August – Global sea surface temperatures outside the polar regions reached a record daily average of 21.10 °C (69.98 °F) according to data from the Copernicus Climate Change Service, surpassing previous records driven by an intensifying El Niño and underlying global warming.

=== September ===
- The WMO issued an unusually dire report that El Niño is "supersizing before our eyes" and forecast that it would likely be the strongest event since monitoring began. Records on El Niño magnitude date back to 1950.
- September, which is considered to be the peak of the Atlantic hurricane season, has not seen a single Atlantic hurricane forming in the 2026 season, marking the latest season to feature no hurricanes since the first weather satellites were launched in the 1960s. Typically, three hurricanes have already formed in the north Atlantic by late-September, but due to increased vertical wind shear, no hurricanes have formed in the Atlantic to date, the first season during the satellite era to do so, and breaking a more than a hundred-year-old record; the last season to feature no hurricanes during September was the 1914 season, which eventually did not record any hurricanes at all, although it is possible that some systems were undetected during that year. In contrast, the Pacific season was hyperactive due to El Niño conditions, with the number of named storms in the northeastern by September Pacific being about 40% above average for this time of year. Hawaii, an area that was previously hit by Hurricane Lala in August, was grazed by Hurricane Lowell and was also threatened by Hurricane Nolo. Elsewhere in the Eastern Pacific basin, Hurricane Polo hit western Mexico the same month; both Lowell and Polo peaked as Category 5 hurricanes, while Nolo peaked as a high-end Category 4.
- 14 September – The Niño 3.4 Relative Oceanic Niño Index (RONI), which measures how far above the normal temperature a certain region of the Pacific surface has become, reached 2 °C, the NOAA's official criterion for a "very strong" El Niño event. Monthly RONI values remain below 2 °C as of 15 September; a rolling average of three months of data is required to fully gauge the event. Daily Nino 3.4 SST Values also reach 3 °C, becoming one of only two El Niños to achieve daily Niño index 3.4 SSTs of 3 °C since modern recording began in 1950, the other being the 2014-2016 El Nino.
- 21 September – The very strong El Niño reaches a record-breaking 3.05°C rise as measured against the average of 1991-2020, months before the usual peak in November or December, when it is forecast as per the average of 14 models to reach 4.0 °C. Gov. Gavin Newsom of California declares a state of emergency.

=== October ===
- 5 October – Niño 3.4 region temperatures reach above 30°C for the first time in recorded history.
- 8 October – NOAA stated that there was a greater than 83% chance that the 2026-2027 El Niño would become the strongest El Niño on record by October-December.
- 9 October – Hurricane Isaias makes landfall near Destin, Florida with sustained winds of 105 miles per hour (169 km/h). It is the ninth named storm, first hurricane, and first major hurricane of the 2026 Atlantic hurricane season. It ties the record for the latest date a first hurricane was recorded in the Atlantic basin since 1905. In San Diego, California ocean levels are 1.2 feet (0.37 m) above normal, with the approaching Tropical Storm Rachel adding to the flood risk. Several beachfront homes in the city of Redondo Beach are condemned. On the weekend of 9 October it is predicted that this second Kelvin wave associated with this El Niño event shall raise the San Francisco Bay water level by up to 9 inches (23 cm), and in Santa Cruz to raise the sea level 1.5 feet (0.46 m) above normal. (The first occurred in May/June.)
- 21 October – UN Humanitarian Chief Tom Fletcher describes El Niño as a "Behemoth" during an appeal for aid for those affected by the ongoing El Nino, the first official to use the "Behemoth" adjective when addressing an El Nino event.
- 26 October – American military forces are accused of weaponizing El Niño during the Somali Civil War.

=== November ===
- 9 November – The WMO issued an updated assessment confirming that the strengthening El Niño was acting as a major risk multiplier alongside background global warming, pushing global climate indicators to near-record levels. NOAA's Climate Prediction Center maintained a high probability (>79%) of a strong-to-very strong event persisting through the early 2027 months. Concurrently, humanitarian agencies highlighted mounting food security, drought, and flooding pressures linked to the developing event across East Africa and parts of Central America.

== Preparations ==
The scale of this event notwithstanding, given that El Niño is a well-known phenomenon that has been studied for many decades, preparations can be made for specific geographic areas which have historically been impacted, particularly southern Africa.

On 4 June 2026, the UN's Food and Agriculture Organization and World Food Programme issued their first joint appeal for donations to avert a global humanitarian crisis. The World Meteorological Organization also urged preparation.

In mid-July, the NOAA gave 97% odds that a strong El Niño would persist through spring 2027.

The charity Americares, noting any strong El Niño's impact on the severity of heat, wildfires (and wildfire smoke), flooding, and hurricanes, termed the expected scenario as "a global shuffling of risk". Regional preparations vary. For example, Southern California anticipates severe rain and flooding, with the harbingers of unusually severe king tides already occurring in August whereas Australia anticipates drought and severe wildfires, and India expects an erratic, drier monsoon season.

Areas of Africa have barely recovered from the effects of the 2023–2024 El Niño event, having experienced extreme floods and droughts. Oxfam is coordinating with other aid groups to shore up vital infrastructure such as electrical and water systems. The UN's Food and Agriculture Organization (FAO) and World Food Programme (WFP) are aiming to reach 8.8 million people across 22 high-risk countries with anticipatory action funding for resilience projects to get ahead of the crisis.

China has launched a 100-day campaign to prepare for the effects of alternating severe rain, drought, and heat on agriculture and updating its early weather warning system, with cities being encouraged to draw up their own "climate risk" plans. Policies are being changed from municipal down to the corporate level, with employers in the financial sector, for example, being mandated to provide public health measures, being at risk of prosecution if they fail to implement them.

The top climate expert at the African Development Bank anticipates that this event will reduce GDP in heavily affected countries by 1% to 2% on average, about $10–$20 billion across the continent, and prompt mass migration from the hardest-hit areas.

Seasonal temperature and rainfall forecast for September–November 2026

In Kenya, more directly affected by the Indian Ocean Dipole (IOD), the Kenya Meteorological Services Authority issued an early alert in mid-June, but government preparations were critiqued in late July by former chief justice and United Green Movement (UGM) party leader David Maraga. The agency has since called on both national and county governments to promote climate-smart agriculture, improving drainage systems, strengthening early warning systems, and advising farmers on suitable crop varieties for wetter conditions.

Autoridad del Canal de Panamá (ACP), drawing on its experience with the 2023–2024 El Niño event, anticipates that "capacity restrictions will likely be implemented," namely limiting the number of slots for transit and/or the draft—a de facto measure of water displacement—TEU commercial shipping due to falling water levels. It also holds a once-a-day auction for vessels to skip the queue in lieu of a flat fee. The starting bids range from approximately $15,000 for smaller cargo vessels and $55,000 for the largest. In mid-August, a 10,100 TEU won with a $4,000,000 bid to skip the 10-day backlog, double the average bid for the previous seven days.

A May 2026 report from British international affairs think tank Chatham House warned that a strong El Niño could compound existing climate risks in the United Kingdom. The Burnham government acknowledged risks that El Niño creates for food security and severe weather. It has said that it is investing in specific climate modelling services, and has a plan to coordinate responses to severe weather. Following a series of roundtables in the UK convening academics and industry experts, the Government Office for Science identified a series of impacts, including specific risks to food supply and higher prices for commodities such as rice, cocoa and coffee. The Burnham government also noted the potential for changing global weather patterns to increase demand for liquified natural gas, placing additional pressure on domestic energy security.

The United Nations Development Programme (UNDP) published a report in October 2026 warning of the ongoing El Niño event's critical part in exacerbating concurrent shocks to developing nations' economies, namely gasoline and diesel prices and high debt levels. The report, and statements given by UNDP administrator Alexander De Croo before the World Bank and the International Monetary Fund, stated that this "triple shock" was creating "a perfect storm" capable of bringing "tens if not hundreds of millions of people" in developing countries into poverty. An October 2026 press release from climate change think tank E3G reported on how upcoming talks between European leaders within the European Council would need to account for consequences related to the El Niño event in tandem with energy shocks and Chinese trade conflicts.

== Impact ==
On 22 August 2026, measurements from the Copernicus Climate Change Service recorded the highest average sea surface temperature between 60°N and 60°S in recorded history of 21.11 °C (70.00 °F), surpassing the prior record of 21.09 °C (69.96 °F) set in March 2024. Copernicus attributed the record to heat added by El Niño in addition to "decades of human-driven warming".

Satellite imagery from NASA's Plankton, Aerosol, Cloud, ocean Ecosystem (PACE) Earth observation satellite recorded a significant decrease in concentrations of chlorophyll in the oceans, indicating a precipitous decline in phytoplankton concentrations. Goddard Space Flight Centre oceanographers Graham Trolley and Matthew Kehrli stated that the suppression of nutrient-rich water to the surface due to weakened easterly trade winds and lower upwelling leads to decreased phytoplankton growth. This in turn lowers available food for zooplankton, thus lowering available food for fish, marine mammals, and seabirds higher on the food web.

=== Africa ===
Environmental researchers of the Famine Early Warning Systems Network attributed Summer 2026 droughts in regions of eastern Africa, including Ethiopia and western Kenya, to the relatively earlier start and intensification of the 2026–2027 El Niño event. Poor maize and grain harvests in the region were attributed in part due to significantly lower rainfall impacted by the El Niño event.

The United Nations' Food and Agriculture Organization reported that the El Niño event caused a delayed and less precipitous rainy season in Sudan. This resulted in significantly lowered water levels in the Nile, significantly impacting Sudan's growing season and contributing to an ongoing famine in Sudan initially triggered by the concurrent Sudanese civil war. More widely, the UN World Food Program estimates that almost 50 million more people could suffer acute hunger by 2027, with southern Africa and Central America being particularly at risk.

=== Europe ===
Heatwaves that impacted France are thought to have been in part caused by the developing El Niño, thus contributing to France's 2026 wildfire season being classified as the worst in the nation since 1949.

=== Middle East ===
On 27 August, the Israel Meteorological Service predicted unprecedented weekend rainfall in Central Israel of up to 20–30 mm (0.79–1.18 in) in one to three hours. It had issued a warning in July of such extreme weather events occurring due to the extreme El Niño.

=== Central America and Caribbean ===
The El Niño event began to impact Panama during Summer 2026, causing at least 15,600 people to be impacted by "torrential rains and severe flooding" in its Caribbean and northern regions. The El Niño event caused a significant rainfall deficit in its central and metropolitan regions, leading to water stress in eleven watersheds. The resulting decrease in water levels contributed to record high Panama Canal transit slot fees. In order to conserve limited water, the Panama Canal Authority plans to decrease the limit of daily Panama Canal transits from thirty-six to thirty-four starting 3 September, and further limit them to thirty-two starting on 15 September.

Agriculture in Guatemala experienced increased crop stress due to El Niño-exacerbated temperature increases and rainfall shortages, with rainfall 85% below its July average.

The presence of El Niño has been correlated with the dry conditions of the Caribbean basin during the summer of 2026. Together with the North Atlantic Oscillation (NAO), it has aggravated the severe drought rapidly strengthened throughout the Caribbean region during summer, with high impact to the agriculture of the region and strict water rationing occurring across areas of Jamaica, the Dominican Republic, Puerto Rico and the Virgin Islands. While the month of May typically marks the beginning of the wet season, Puerto Rico and the U.S. Virgin Islands saw 60% less rain than usual according to the National Integrated Drought Information System (NIDIS) and, by the end of August, about 75% of the island of Puerto Rico was experiencing at least a moderate drought and 44% experiencing an extreme drought. Outdated water infrastructure has further affected the San Juan metropolitan area in Puerto Rico, with rationing of water being implemented in the Loíza and La Plata reservoir systems.

=== North America ===
AccuWeather senior meteorologist Chad Merrill and Arizona State University meteorologist Randy Cerveny both partially attributed the 2026 Grand Canyon flood that resulted in the deaths of at least three hikers to the effects of El Niño. Merrill stated that increased atmospheric moisture due to exceptionally warm sea-surface temperatures linked to El Niño intensified monsoon precipitation, which caused the flash flooding. Additionally, the El Niño event was also partially responsible for two hurricanes (Hurricane Lala and Hurricane Lowell) affecting Hawaii within a few weeks of each other, when Hawaii rarely receives tropical cyclone impacts.

=== South America ===
On 10 June 2026, the Peruvian Government issued a temporary suspension of its fishing season due to predictions of severe contractions in fish populations caused by El Niño. In prior El Niño periods, warmer water pushed towards Peru's waters, which led to less suitable habitats for anchoveta due to it pressing cold water downward and suppressing the upwelling of nutrients needed for plankton to be available in suitable amounts for larger populations. As a result, Peru's fishing sector contracted by nearly 75% in June and July 2026, with a 99.9% decline in metric tons of anchovy fished in June 2026 compared to June 2025, and a 99.1% decline in July 2026 compared to July 2025.

In mid-August, the suspension became a full closure to prevent overfishing, with Peru's Ministry of Production declaring a national fisheries and aquaculture emergency. The Central Reserve Bank of Peru estimated that Peru's fishing sector would face a 30.7% contraction in 2026, with about 78,000 jobs lost that year and a further 44,000 in 2027. It also estimated a reduction in Peru's annual GDP growth form 3.4% to 3.2% in large part due to this contraction in Peru's fishing sector.

In Chile, fishing was affected as well, with the Peruvian anchoveta and Chilean jack mackerel both having its artisanal captures drop significantly. An analysis from climate researcher René Garraud calculated the cost in infrastructure damages related to El Niño to be around 1,200 million US dollars.

=== South Asia ===
In India, monsoon rainfall was almost 50% below average in September due to El Niño, raising the risk of significant reductions in yields of crops such as rice, maize, and cotton. In Sri Lanka, drinking water shortages occurred affecting over 160,000 people. In India, rice exports are predicted to decline by the largest amount since 2009 to 2010, also caused by an El Niño.

=== Southeast Asia ===
The sowing of crops such as rice was delayed across several nations in Southeast Asia, including the Philippines, Cambodia, Thailand, and Vietnam, due to shortages of rainfall in Summer 2026 attributed to the El Niño event.

Drier conditions due to the El Niño event contributed to roughly "230,000 acres of land" burning in wildfires across Indonesia in July alone, which was more than the prior six months together. Wildfires burned "tens of thousands" of acres of land, including old-growth rainforest, in Kalimantan. The smoke from these wildfires led to an increase in respiratory issues in the affected areas, with the Indonesian Ministry of Health reporting that 5,000 people per week were visiting emergency rooms since July, an increase from five hundred each week from January to June. Wildfires were also reported in Lombok, West Papua, and Sumatra. The number of wildfire hotspots recorded in August reached over 3,500, the largest number recorded by the Indonesian Ministry of Forestry since 2015.

Wildfire smoke from Indonesia reached Singapore, Brunei and Malaysia with the Malaysian capital Kuala Lumpur momentarily becoming "the most polluted city on earth" on 25 August 2026, according to IQAir data. Dozens of schools in Indonesia and Malaysia were temporarily closed due to wildfire smoke. Brunei recorded an air quality level of "very unhealthy" at 2:00 PM on 1 September 2026 in the Brunei Muara district with a pollutants standard index (PSI) reading of 219, with other districts also experiencing "unhealthy" readings over 100.

Papua New Guinea, one of the wettest places on Earth, suffered severe drought which devastated subsistence agriculture and forced schools to close. Some areas have since August 2026 received less than a quarter of their usual rainfall, and have even had crops destroyed by frost.
