= 2026 Indonesia wildfires =

Wildfires in Indonesia

- Part of 2026 El Niño
- Wildfire at night in Pulang Pisau, Central Kalimantan
- Date: January 2026 – ongoing

Statistics
- Status: Ongoing wildfire
- Burned area: 1.92 million hectares

Impacts
- Deaths: 1,700

Data from Indonesian Ministry of Forestry, cited by Reuters, showed that 107,465 hectares (265,552 acres) of land were affected by fires from January through June 2026, an increase of 110% compared with the same period in 2023, when El Niño last affected Indonesia. This figure was updated on 18 August, with Minister of Forestry Raja Juli Antoni stating that 202,000 hectares of forests and land had burned across Indonesia. The fires caused a regional haze crisis, with severe air pollution from the fires impacting Indonesia and other countries in the region.

It was later identified that Riau, Jambi, South Sumatra, West Kalimantan, Central Kalimantan, and South Kalimantan as priority provinces for fire prevention and response. Fires were also reported in other parts of Indonesia, including Java, Papua, and the Lesser Sunda Islands. According to data from the Ministry of Forestry's Sipongi system as of 20 August 2026, the following are the ten provinces with the largest areas affected by forest and land fires:

Province	Area (in hectares)
West Kalimantan	38,310.86
South Papua	25,838.53
East Nusa Tenggara	19,565.16
West Nusa Tenggara	17,406.46
Riau	15,738.92
Maluku	14,677.00
East Java	10,835.28
East Kalimantan	8,019.63
South Kalimantan	7,634.46
Riau Islands	5,760.90

According to Nusantara Atlas satellite data, as of the end of September, 1.92 million hectares has been burned in Indonesia, double the size of the area burned a month earlier.

The fires caused 1,700 deaths in August and more than 283,000 cases of acute respiratory tract infections between 18 August and 13 October, threatened local wildlife and increased climate change-causing greenhouse gas emissions.The fires have also polluted air in neighbouring nations.

== Cause ==
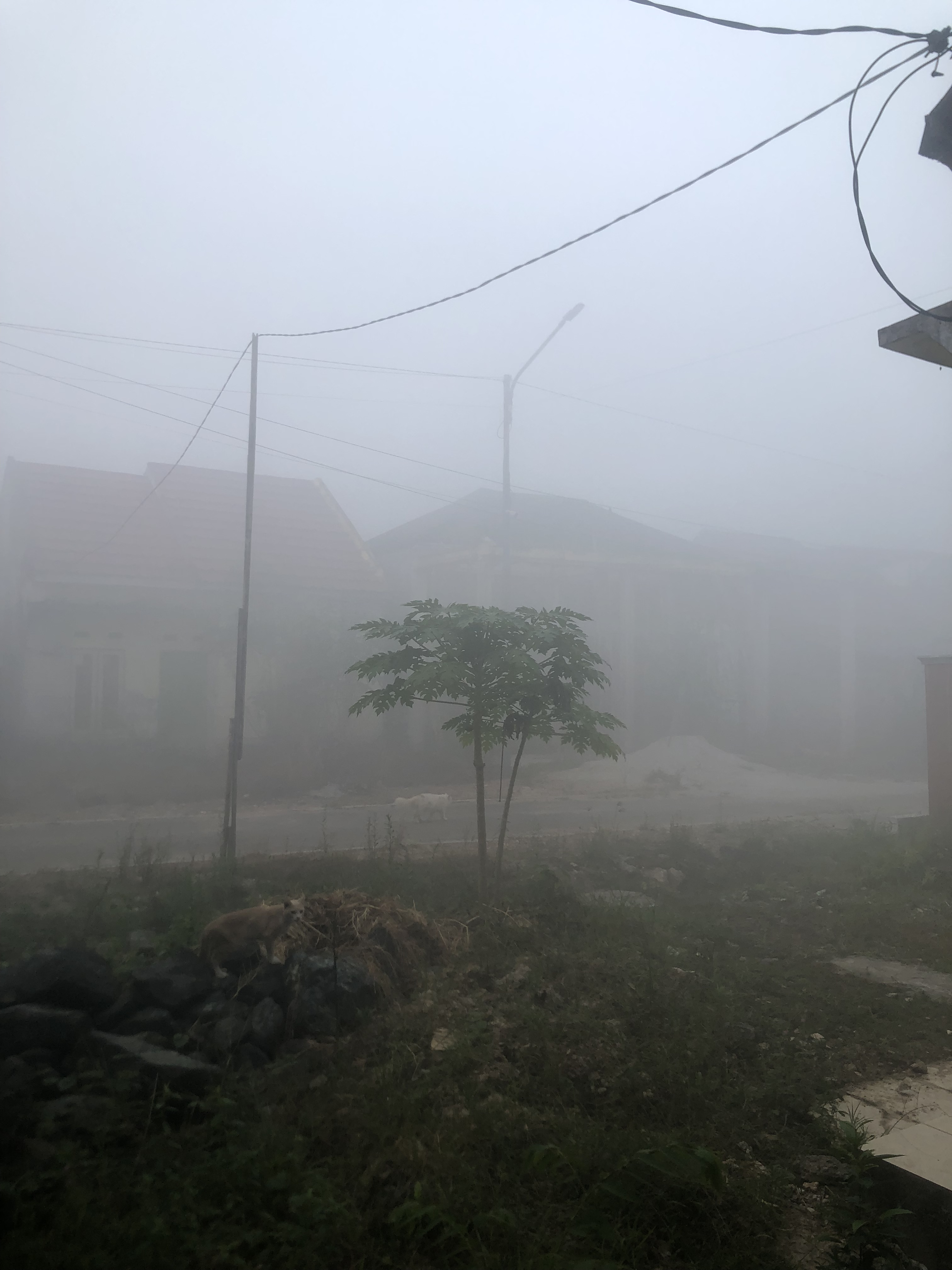
Choking smoke haze hit Landasan Ulin in Banjarbaru, South Kalimantan

Since the New Order era, Indonesia has experienced wildfires of various scales. The wildfires are driven by forest clearing and a lack of preventive measures. However, in 2026, these fires became extreme due to a very strong El Niño phenomenon. Large-scale forest clearing for plantation and mining activities is believed to have left the land extremely dry and prone to fire. The use of fire for land clearance is often considered the most efficient method, but in practice it causes the greatest economic and environmental losses.

Another plantation malpractice, involving the construction of drainage canals, is the main cause for peatlands which naturally retain water, to dry out. This makes underground smoldering fires difficult to extinguish and creates the potential for recurring fires over the long term. Illegal logging, which damages vegetation cover and further dries out the soil, combined with prolonged dry seasons, can significantly increase the risk of fires.

A 2026 study has examined peatland restoration in West and Central Kalimantan, investigating how blocking the drainage canals and rewetting the peatlands could reduce wildfire risk. Researchers found that effective peatland restoration could help prevent fires by maintaining wet conditions in areas that would be vulnerable to burning.

Human activities that involved open fire in peatland, mostly land clearing for agricultural or mining purposes, are suspected to be the main driving factor of the wildfires. This is made worse by the dry season caused by the developing 2026–2027 El Niño event. This deforestation method is considered to be the most efficient even though it possesses the most economic and environmental risks. Furthermore, drainage canal for palm oil plantation forces the water-storing wet peatland to be dried up. This increases the risk of recurring fires in the long run as the subsurface fire from burning peat embers is notoriously hard to extinguish.

WALHI (The Indonesian Forum for Environment) reported that 74% of the hotspots in Kalimantan were located within corporate concession areas, specifically 10,739 hotspots in oil palm plantation Right to Cultivate (HGU) areas, 7,880 hotspots in mining concessions, and 6,905 hotspots in Forest Utilization Business Permits (PBPH) areas. Meanwhile, National Geographic Indonesia reported that the conflict of interest between business and political entities causes land fires to recur continuously, making the issue difficult to resolve comprehensively.

The Indonesia Ministry of Environment announced that it was investigating 19 unnamed companies linked to the wildfires, out of a total of 42 that hold concessions with high wildfire potential.

== Impacts ==
=== Human health ===
Wild fire smoke caused 1,700 deaths in August. Ministry of Health data showed more than 283,000 cases of acute respiratory tract infections across seven provinces from 18 August to 13 October due to forest fires, while 3.4 million people are at risk of infections due to exposure. Schools in some areas of Indonesia were forced to close.

Toxic haze from the burning has moved across Indonesia's borders, impacting air quality in other countries including Malaysia, Singapore and Papua New Guinea.

=== Environment ===
According to Nusantara Atlas satellite data, as of the end of September, 1.92 million hectares has been burned in Indonesia, double the size of the area burned a month earlier.

The wild fires threaten local wildlife, including orangutans.

The fires are releasing carbon into the air (76m tonnes (MtC) of carbon as of 7 September) which contributes to climate change.

== By province ==
=== Papua ===
As of 20 August 2026, 25,838.53 hectares of land has been burned in South Papua. Massive land clearing for National Strategic Projects, which includes food estate, palm oil plantation, and mining, is criticized to be the driving factor of wildfires in Papua.

=== Kalimantan ===
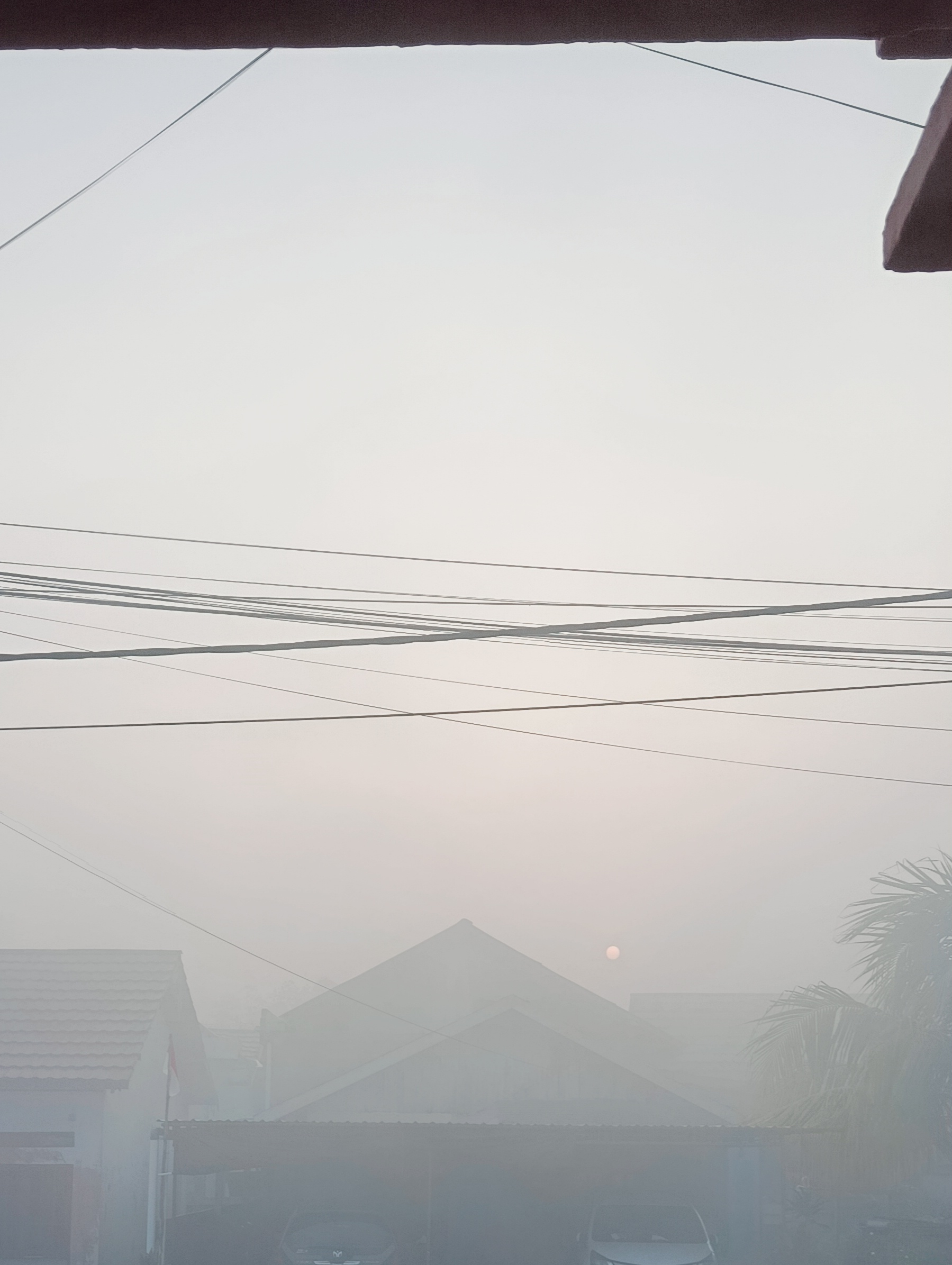
Morning sky in Palangka Raya, Central Kalimantan.

In July 2026, 200 fire spots were confirmed in 12 regencies in West Kalimantan that burned 28,680.47 hectares of land.

East Kalimantan recorded 1,287.9 hectares of land burned per 11 August from 218 individual events.

South Kalimantan recorded 3,387 hectares of land burned per 11 August.

On 17 August, Central Kalimantan reported 3,657 hectares of forest and land burned spread across 570 hotspots.

=== Java and Lesser Sunda Islands ===
West Nusa Tenggara reported 8,895.43 hectares affected by wildfires as of 20 July.

Central Java reported 166 instances of wildfires that affected 306 hectares of coverage. On 3 August, wildfires were detected at Bromo Tengger Semeru National Park. The fire was burning for several days and burned 1,120 hectares of land. The government announced that the fire was only fully extinguished on 14 August, while the national park was opened to the public again on 20 August.

=== Sulawesi ===
Indonesian Meteorology, Climatology, and Geophysical Agency classified fire risk in Central Sulawesi at mid to very high risk during the 9–15 August period.

=== Sumatra ===
From January to August, wildfires swept 15,477 hectares of land in Riau. The vast majority of the land burned was peatland. South Sumatra reported 1,382.4 hectares of land burned from January to April. Jambi reported 619.75 hectares of land affected by wildfires per 16 August.

Between 25 and 26 January, 2,685.43 hectares of protected conservation area was burned in Way Kambas National Park jungle and rehabilitation zone. The wildfires were recurring until July in at least 20 fire spots.

== Reactions ==
Wanting to address widespread fires and the impact of trans-boundary haze, the government of Indonesia announced a strengthening of leadership in disaster management and land restoration on 15 October.
