= Air Pollution Index =

Air quality measurement in Malaysia

The Air Pollution Index (API; Malay: Indeks Pencemaran Udara) is a simple and generalized way to describe the air quality, which is used in Malaysia. It is calculated from several sets of air pollution data and was formerly used in mainland China and Hong Kong. In mainland China the API was replaced by an updated air quality index in early 2012 and on 30 December 2013 Hong Kong moved to a health based index.

== Malaysia ==
The air quality in Malaysia is reported as the API (Air Pollutant Index) or in Malay as IPU (Indeks Pencemaran Udara). Four of the index's pollutant components (i.e., carbon monoxide, ozone, nitrogen dioxide and sulfur dioxide) are reported in ppmv but PM_{2.5} particulate matter is reported in μg/m^{3}.

This scale below shows the Health classifications used by the Malaysian government.

API	Air Pollution Level
0–50	Good
51–100	Moderate
101–200	Unhealthy
201–300	Very unhealthy
301–500	Hazardous

If the API exceeds 500, a state of emergency is declared in the reporting area. Usually, this means that non-essential government services are suspended, and all ports in the affected area are closed. There may also be a prohibition on private sector commercial and industrial activities in the reporting area excluding the food sector.

== Former indices ==
=== China ===
China's State Environment Protection Agency (SEPA) is responsible for measuring the level of air pollution in China. As of 28 August 2008, SEPA monitored daily pollution level in 86 of its major cities. The AQI level was based on the level of five atmospheric pollutants, namely sulfur dioxide (SO_{2}), nitrogen dioxide (NO_{2}), suspended particulates (PM_{10}), carbon monoxide (CO), and ozone (O_{3}), measured at the monitoring stations throughout each city.

AQI Mechanics
An individual score is assigned to the level of each pollutant and the final AQI is the highest of those five scores. The pollutants can be measured quite differently. SO_{2}, NO_{2} and PM_{10} concentration are measured as average per day. CO and O_{3} are more harmful and are measured as average per hour. The final AQI value is calculated per day.

The scale for each pollutant is non-linear, as is the final AQI score. Thus an AQI of 100 does not mean twice the pollution of AQI at 50, nor does it mean twice as harmful. While an AQI of 50 from day 1 to 182 and AQI of 100 from day 183 to 365 does provide an annual average of 75, it does not mean the pollution is acceptable even if the benchmark of 100 is deemed safe. This is because the benchmark is a 24-hour target. The annual average must match against the annual target. It is entirely possible to have safe air every day of the year but still fail the annual pollution benchmark.

AQI and Health Implications (Daily Targets)

AQI	Air Pollution Level	Health Implications
0–50	Excellent	No health implications
51–100	Good	No health implications
101–150	Slightly Polluted	Slight irritations may occur, individuals with breathing or heart problems should reduce outdoor exercise.
151–200	Lightly Polluted	Slight irritations may occur, individuals with breathing or heart problems should reduce outdoor exercise.
201–250	Moderately Polluted	Healthy people will be noticeably affected. People with breathing or heart problems will experience reduced endurance in activities. These individuals and elders should remain indoors and restrict activities.
251–300	Heavily Polluted	Healthy people will be noticeably affected. People with breathing or heart problems will experience reduced endurance in activities. These individuals and elders should remain indoors and restrict activities.
300+	Severely Polluted	Healthy people will experience reduced endurance in activities. There may be strong irritations and symptoms and may trigger other illnesses. Elders and the sick should remain indoors and avoid exercise. Healthy individuals should avoid out door activities.

=== Hong Kong ===
The API was in use in Hong Kong from June 1995 to December 2013. It was measured and updated hourly by the Environmental Protection Department (EPD). Moreover, the EPD made forecasts of the API for the following day every day.

The API was based on the level of six atmospheric pollutants, namely sulphur dioxide (SO_{2}), nitrogen dioxide (NO_{2}), respirable suspended particulates, carbon monoxide (CO), ozone (O_{3}), and lead (Pb), measured at all the monitoring stations throughout the territory. It was replaced by the Air Quality Health Index on 30 December 2013.

There are 11 General Stations and 3 Roadside Stations. The former includes Central / Western, Eastern, Kwai Chung, Kwun Tong, Sha Tin, Sham Shui Po, Tai Po, Tap Mun, Tsuen Wan, Tung Chung, and Yuen Long; the latter Causeway Bay, Central, and Mong Kok.

In Hong Kong, there were two types of API: General API and Roadside API. The EPD reported the latest APIs hourly.

The index and the air quality objectives were set in 1987; and pollutant levels are measured over varying periods, in μg/m^{3}. There are hourly, 24-hour and annual targets for sulfur dioxide and nitrogen dioxide, and 24-hour and annual targets for particulates.

The table below shows the official Health Implications of the respective AQHI levels in Hong Kong.

AQHI Level	Air Pollution Level	Health Implications
1,2,3	Low	Not expected.
4,5,6	Medium	Not expected for the general population.
7	High	Acute health effects are not expected but chronic effects may be observed if one is persistently exposed to such levels.
8,9,10	Very High	People with existing heart or respiratory illnesses may notice mild aggravation of their health conditions. Generally healthy individuals may also notice some discomfort.
10+	Severe	People with existing heart or respiratory illnesses may experience significant aggravation of their symptoms. There may also be widespread symptoms in the healthy population (e.g. eye irritation, wheezing, coughing, phlegm and sore throats).

In 1998, the Education Bureau's recommended schools to curtail outdoor activities when the index reached 200, whereas leading healthcare advocates are urging that the level be revised to 100. The World Health Organization revised its air quality guideline levels of sulfur dioxide, nitrogen dioxide and ozone in 2006 in light of new scientific evidence. The WHO also introduced new measurement guidelines for very small particulates which are more dangerous to pulmonary function. At the '200' level, Hong Kong levels of SO_{2} (800μg/m^{3}) and NO_{2} (1,130μg/m^{3}) are 40 times and 5½ times WHO guidelines respectively; the equivalent for particulates (350μg/m^{3}) is 7 times WHO guidelines.

== See also ==
- Air pollution
- Air quality index
- Atmospheric dispersion modeling
- Emission standard
- European emission standards
- Haze
- Pollutant Standards Index
- Smog
