= Windah Basudara =

Indonesian YouTube live streamer

- Born: Brando Franco Windah; 14 March 1992 (age 34); Manado, North Sulawesi, Indonesia
- Education: STIKOM-London School of Public Relations (dropped out)
- Occupations: YouTuber; Content creator; Internet personality; Streamer
- Partner: Sesilia Agnes

YouTube information
- Channel: Windah Basudara
- Years active: 2018–present
- Genres: Video game live streaming; Let's Play; Comedy; vlogs
- Subscribers: 20.6 million
- Views: 5.9 billion
- Last updated: 31 October 2026

Brando Franco Windah (born 14 March 1992), better known by his online alias Windah Basudara or simply as Brando, is an Indonesian YouTuber and online streamer, best known for his video game live streaming and Let's Play videos on YouTube and noted for his comedic persona, he is also the brand ambassador for the Indonesian-based esport organization Rex Regum Qeon since 2021.

== Early life ==
Brando Franco Windah was born on 14 March 1992 in Manado, North Sulawesi, he is the second child of 4 siblings. He has two sisters, Florence and Caroline, and a younger brother, Vincent. Brando and his family moved and settle in Jakarta when he was still in Kindergarten, and grew up there. He attended SD Santo Vincentius elementary, SMP Marsudirini junior high and SMA Santo Bellarminus high school.

When Windah was in the eleventh grade, he was frequently bullied by his classmates, eventually leading him to quit school and work for his father as an internet café operator. His parents convinced him to continue his education to graduate with a diploma, so he later applied for a homeschooling program run by Kak Seto, an Indonesian Psychologist.

After graduating from high school, Windah went to college where he studied International relations for a Bachelor's degree (Strata-1 in Indonesian academic standard) at The London School of Public Relations (LSPR), but he had to drop out due to economic constraints.

After quitting college, Windah began his working life as a waiter in a small café in Jakarta, where he earned around IDR 900,000 per month. He quit after only a month due to the low wage. Windah later worked in noumerous hotel positions.

== Career ==
Windah had been fond of playing video games since childhood. The first console he played on was a Nintendo Entertainment System. Since beginning elementary school, Windah was fond of his PlayStation 1 (PSX) and the RPG game Suikoden II.

Windah's interest in gaming continued into adulthood, although at that time he was working as a waiter in a five-star hotel. After he saw the success of YouTubers like MiawAug, he felt he had the potential to become a professional Gaming YouTuber and decided to resign from the hotel. To begin his new career, he bought an Asus ROG laptop for IDR 13,000,000, but he was still nervous about starting his own channel, so he planned to invite two of his siblings, Caroline and Vincent, so each could start their own channel at the same time. However, because they were still at school, he had no choice but to build a channel by himself. He created the channel Windah Basudara, taken from the family name Windah, and basudara, which means 'siblings' in Manado language.

=== YouTube career ===
Windah Basudara started his YouTube career on 29 Dec 2018. To kick-off his YouTuber career, the laptop which Windah had paid IDR 13 million for a month earlier was damaged, so it had to be taken in for repair. Now desperate, he tried a return to hotel work, but each application was rejected. Windah confided in his mother, who offered him a loan so he could buy a new PC. He revealed that once he had difficulties getting viewers, so he began adding spam links in chats on several social media platforms such as Facebook, Google+ and Line Square.

Due to his massive success as a streamer, he now amasses around 100k viewers during his live streams. In April 2019, Windah Basudara only had a thousand subscribers, in June 2019, his subscribers increased to 100,000. He has collaborated with MiawAug in the game Secret Neighbor and was also invited to appear on stage at the 2019 YouTube FanFest event. By June 2020 he had reached one million subscribers. He is also known for the acting he usually performs during or at the end of his live streams, as part of his unique persona. He said that the performance is a form of gimmick to entertain and hopefully attract more viewers. He also said that he spent millions on costumes and miscellaneous items.

On 8 July 2021, Windah Basudara was officially announced, via their Instagram account (@teamrrq), as the new brand ambassador for the RRQ e-Sport team.

In addition to his YouTube success, Windah has also contributed to fundraising events. One of the most memorable was a 24-hour livestream, where he managed to collect funds of IDR 50 million which he donated towards helping to deal with COVID-19.

=== Nominations and awards ===
External videos
- GTV and Dunia Games Awards 2021 (Note: "Indonesian Esports Awards 2021" and "Dunia Games Awards 2021")
- "CONTENT CREATOR GAMING TERFAVORIT | INDONESIAN ESPORTS AWARDS 2021" on YouTube
- "Awarding Night DG Awards 2021" on YouTube

On 18 November 2021 at 18.30 UTC+07:00, GTV presented the Indonesian Esports Awards 2021. The Awards honoured the best Indonesian Esport players and YouTubers by Awarding the nominees based on the results of a public vote. The Indonesian Esports Awards 2021 was conducted by means of an online survey, due to spread of the coronavirus. Voting was held from 20 October to 18 November 2021. Windah Basudara managed to amass the most votes to win the Most Favorite Gaming Content Creator of 2021, despite tough competition in the other four nominees: Dyland Pros, Jess No Limit, Jonathan Liandi and Oura Gaming.

The Dunia Games Awards 2021 was held 23–24 December 2021 and presented by Dunia Games and Telkomsel. The awards announcement was made virtually through MAXstream, as well as Dunia Games and Telkomsel's YouTube channels. There were 17 categories and winners in DGA 2021. Those categories were presented for gamers, professional esports athletes, content creators, esports organisers, local game publishers and developers, celebrity gamers, and esports fan clubs. The winner of the 2021 Dunia Games Award was determined by public vote held from 1–14 December 2021. Windah Basudara won the award for Gaming Content Creator of the Year.

Date	Award	Category	Awarded by	Nominee	Result
18 November 2021	Indonesian Esports Awards 2021	Most Favorite Gaming Content Creator (Note: Indonesian: Konten Kreator Gaming Terfavorit)	GTV	Windah Basudara	Won
23 December 2021	Dunia Games Awards 2021	Gaming Content Creator of the Year	Telkomsel and Dunia Games	Windah Basudara	Won
