= Transboundary Haze Pollution Act of 2014 =

Statute of the Parliament of Singapore

Transboundary Haze Pollution Act 2014
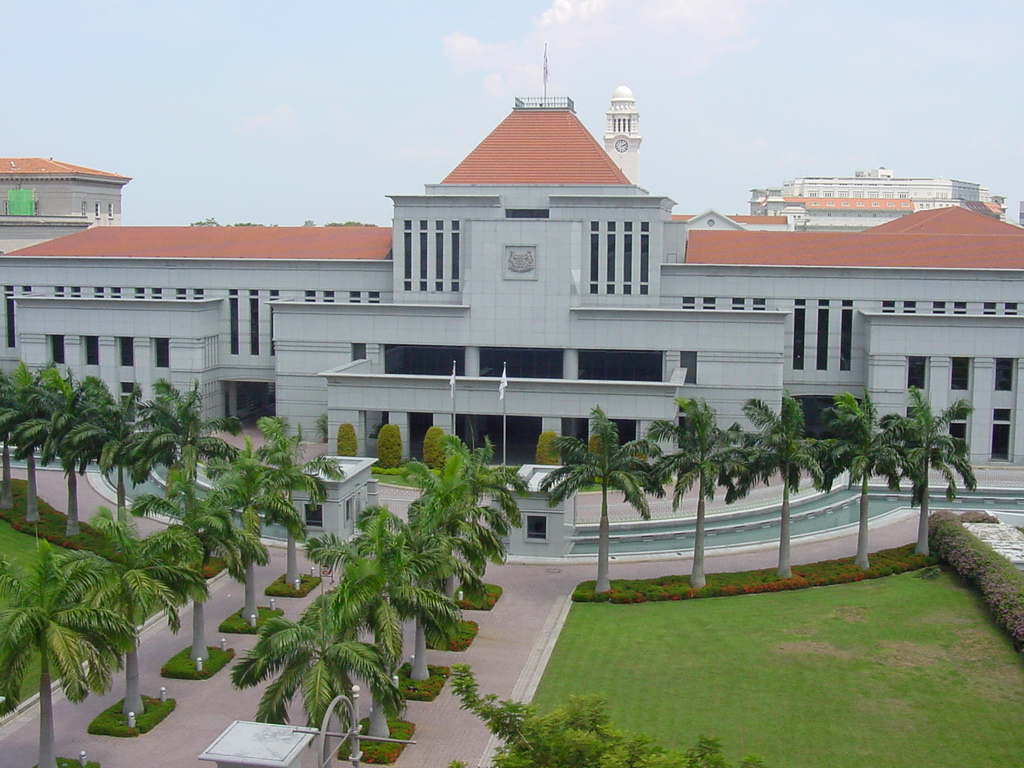

Parliament of Singapore
- Long title: An Act concerning conduct which causes or contributes to haze pollution in Singapore, and to provide for related matters.
- Enacted by: Parliament of Singapore
- Enacted: 5 August 2014
- Assented to: 10 September 2014
- Commenced: 25 September 2014
- Introduced by: Minister for the Environment and Water Resources, Vivian Balakrishnan
- Status: In force

The Transboundary Haze Pollution Act of 2014 (THPA) is a statute of the Parliament of Singapore that criminalizes conduct which causes or contributes to haze pollution in Singapore, and to provide for related matters such as deterrence. The law is designed specifically to allow legal in suing companies for environmental pollution.

== Background ==
Since 1972, Malaysia and Singapore suffered recurrent episodes of severe air pollution due to agricultural burning in Sumatra and Kalimantan, Indonesia. The ASEAN Agreement on Transboundary Haze Pollution was intended to prevent such pollution. However, as of 2006, Indonesia and the Philippines had not ratified the Agreement. Following a severe occurrence in 2006, economist and professor at the National University of Singapore, Ivan Png, wrote a series of opinion articles in the Malaysian and Singapore media to advocate that environmental laws be extended to outlaw trans-boundary emissions.

== Overview ==
In August 2014, the Parliament of Singapore enacted the Transboundary Haze Pollution Act. The Act seeks to deter firms or entities in or outside Singapore from carrying out activities that contribute to transboundary haze affecting Singapore. The law targets companies, not countries, which pollute and those that condone pollution by other companies or individuals that they have management control over. Failure to prevent or stop burning may hence lead the culprit to being guilty of an offence under the law, unless steps are taken to stamp out the practice.

The National Environment Agency with the courts are empowered thus in obtaining information on their concessions upon request without the need of relying on the Indonesian authorities, as well as imprisoning and/or fining targeted companies or individuals which pollute, or whose subsidiaries and/or suppliers pollute.

== Uses of the act ==
With the onset of the El Nino again in 2015, the Transboundary Haze Pollution Act allowed the building of local capacity in dealing with forest fires in Indonesian provinces such as Jambi and Riau. The effectiveness of the new law may depend on the ability to accurately identify errant firms or entities, as well as on law enforcement and cooperation from the Indonesian counterparts. Losses in 2015 estimated at S$700 million were suggested by Environment and Water Resources Minister Masagos Zulkifli due to the haze.

In 2015, the National Environment Agency issued legal notices to six Indonesian businesses regarding fires on their lands. By March 2017, the Agency had closed investigations into two companies -- PT Bumi Sriwijaya Sentosa and PT Wachyuni Mandira. As of September 2021, the cases of the other four companies -- PT Bumi Andalas Permai, PT Bumi Mekar Hijau, PT Sebangun Bumi Andalas Woods Industries and PT Rimba Hutani Mas -- remained open. The four companies are suppliers to Asia Pulp and Paper.

== See also ==
- Masagos Zulkifli
