= Pollutant Standards Index =

Index to describe air quality

The Pollutant Standards Index (PSI) is a type of air quality index used in Singapore, which is a number used to indicate the level of pollutants in air. Initially PSI was based on five air pollutants, but since 1 April 2014 it has also included fine particulate matter (PM_{2.5}).

In addition to the PSI derived by averaging data collected for the past 24 hours, Singapore also publishes 1-hr PM_{2.5} concentrations every hour.

Besides Singapore, some other countries also use air quality indices. However, the calculations used to derive their air quality indices may differ. Different countries also use different names for their indices such as Air Quality Health Index, Air Pollution Index and Pollutant Standards Index.

== History ==
The PSI is based on a scale devised by the United States Environmental Protection Agency (EPA) to provide a way for broadcasts and newspapers to report air quality on a daily basis. The PSI has been used in a number of countries including the United States and Singapore.

Since 1999, the US EPA has replaced the Pollution Standards Index (PSI) with the Air Quality Index (AQI) to incorporate new PM_{2.5} and ozone standards.

Prior to 1 April 2014, Singapore published the PSI and the 1-hour PM_{2.5} reading separately. This 3-hour PSI is unique to Singapore and was introduced in 1997 to provide additional air quality information which would better reflect a more current air quality situation. In 2016, the 3-hour PSI was phased out on the grounds that the 1-hour PM_{2.5} reading was a better indicator of the current air quality.

== Definition of the PSI used in Singapore ==
The PSI considers six air pollutants: sulphur dioxide (SO_{2}), particulate matter (PM_{10}), fine particulate matter (PM_{2.5}), nitrogen dioxide (NO_{2}), carbon monoxide (CO) and ozone (O_{3}).

The concentrations of these pollutants in the ambient air are measured via a network of air monitoring stations located around Singapore.

A sub-index value is computed for each pollutant based on the pollutant's ambient air concentration. The highest sub-index value is then taken as the PSI value. In other words, the PSI is determined by the pollutant with the most significant concentration.

During haze episodes, PM_{2.5} is the most significant pollutant.

The PSI is reported as a number on a scale of 0 to 500. The index figures enable the public to determine whether the air pollution levels in a particular location are good, unhealthy, hazardous or worse. The following PSI table is grouped by index values and descriptors, explaining the effects of the levels, according to Singapore's National Environment Agency (NEA).

PSI	Descriptor	General Health Effects
0–50	Good	None
51–100	Moderate	Few or none for the general population
101–200	Unhealthy	Everyone may begin to experience health effects; members of sensitive groups may experience more serious health effects. To stay indoors.
201–300	Very unhealthy	Health warnings of emergency conditions. The entire population is more likely to be affected.
301+	Hazardous	Health alert: everyone may experience more serious health effects

Note: This chart reflects the guidelines used in Singapore and may differ from other countries. Health advisories are based on the US EPA's guidelines. Only the 24-hour PSI value and not the 3-hour PSI value is correlated to the health effects outlined in NEA's advisories.

=== Record values of the PSI ===
Singapore has been regularly hit by smoke haze from forest fires in nearby Sumatra, Indonesia, brought over by wind. These forest fires have been attributed to the slash-and-burn method favoured by several large plantation owners to clear their land, as opposed to a more expensive and inconvenient mechanical approach using excavators and bulldozers. In June 2013, severe haze hit Singapore, pushing the nation's PSI into Hazardous levels for the first time in its history. Presently, the highest 3-hour PSI reading on record in Singapore is 471 on 20 October 2015 at 11 pm (GMT+8).

=== Association with health outcomes ===
Singapore's computation of PSI and NEA's definitions of PSI ranges have been shown to correlate with a number of health outcomes including all-cause mortality. For sudden cardiac deaths, every increment of 30 units in PSI correlated with 8.15% increased risk of out-of-hospital cardiac arrest on the same day of exposure. This risk was found to remain elevated for 1–5 days after exposure. Similar short-term associations were subsequently found for acute myocardial infarction and acute ischemic stroke in analyses of national registries. In terms of healthcare utilization, both country-wide Emergency Department visits and hospital admissions were increased per unit increase in PSI.
