= Protected areas of Indonesia =

Government-protected environments

Protected areas of Indonesia comprise both terrestrial and marine environments in any of the six IUCN Protected Area categories. There are over 500 protected areas in Indonesia, of which 57 National Parks and another nature and game reserves cover overall 36.1 million ha land area. The total protected land area represents over 18.9% of Indonesia's landmass. Marine Protected Areas comprise over 28.4 million ha (around 9% of Indonesian territorial waters).

== History ==
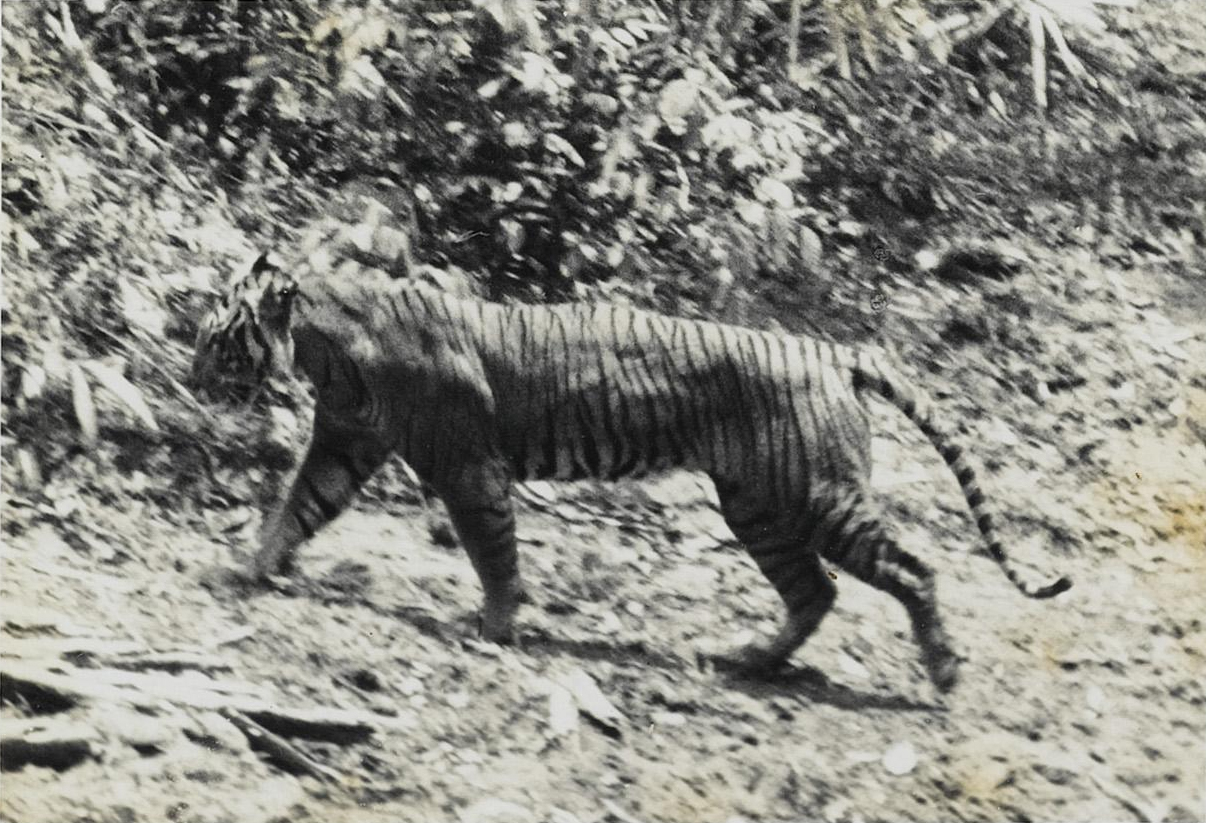
Javan tiger in the Ujung Kulon reserve that was established in 1921.

In 1916 the colonial government of the Dutch East Indies introduced the Natural Monuments Ordinance, which led to the gazetting of 43 nature reserves in the following decade. The first two large reserves were Ujung Kulon (1921) protecting the Javan rhinoceros and Lorentz (1923) protecting indigenous tribes. In 1932 a new legal framework for protected areas was established by the Ordinance on Nature Reserves and Wildlife Sanctuaries. By 1940 a network of 101 natural monuments and 35 wildlife sanctuaries was created.

After Indonesia's independence, legislation to establish game reserves was introduced in 1967, and national parks were first defined in 1982. During the Suharto era the extent of protected areas was increased to cover 10% of the country's land area. In a major expansion in 2004, nine new national parks were created covering over 1,3 million ha.

== National parks ==
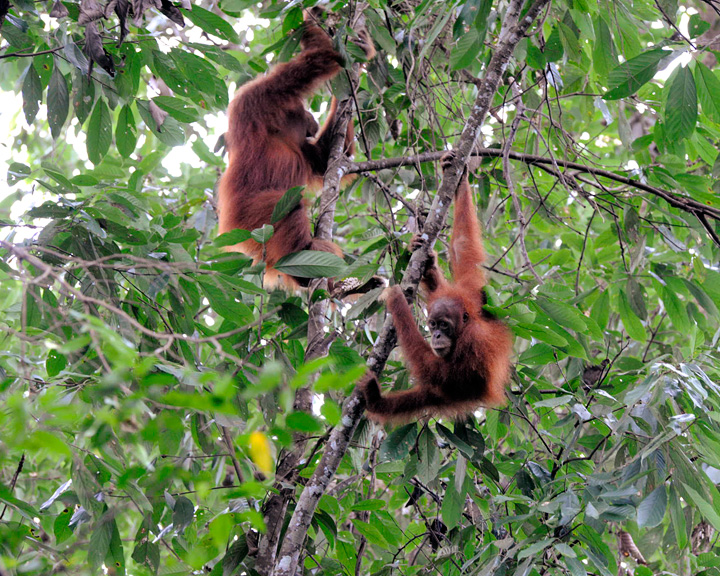
Orangutans in Gunung Leuser NP, one of three parks that form the Tropical Rainforest Heritage of Sumatra.

There are 57 national parks in Indonesia, of which 9 are predominantly marine. Six of them are World Heritage Sites, such as the Tropical Rainforest Heritage of Sumatra that includes three parks. Nine national parks are part of the World Network of Biosphere Reserves and five are wetlands of international importance under the Ramsar convention.

== Nature reserves ==
Protected forest areas or nature reserves have the main function of protecting life support systems to regulate water management, prevent flooding, control erosion, prevent sea water intrusion, and maintain soil fertility; and to protect plant and animal diversity and their ecosystems.

List of protected forests or nature reserves in Indonesia

- Hutan Pinus/Janthoi Nature Reserve, Sumatra
- Isau-Isau Wildlife Reserve, Sumatra
- Singkil Barat Nature Reserve, Sumatra
- Tangkoko Batuangus Nature Reserve, Sulawesi
- Ubud Monkey Forest, Bali

== Marine parks ==
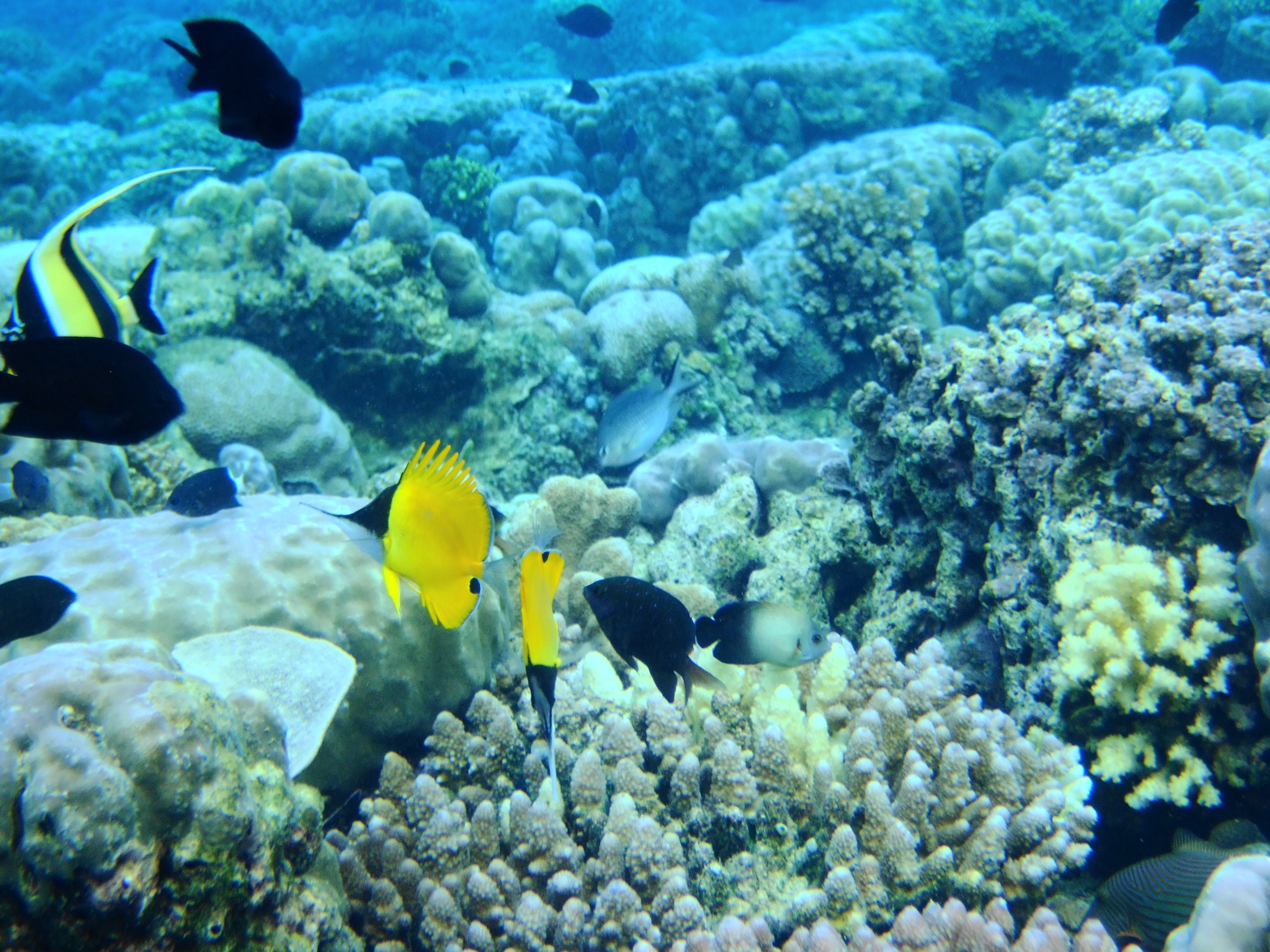
Bunaken National Park in the Coral Triangle, one of Indonesia's over 100 marine protected areas.

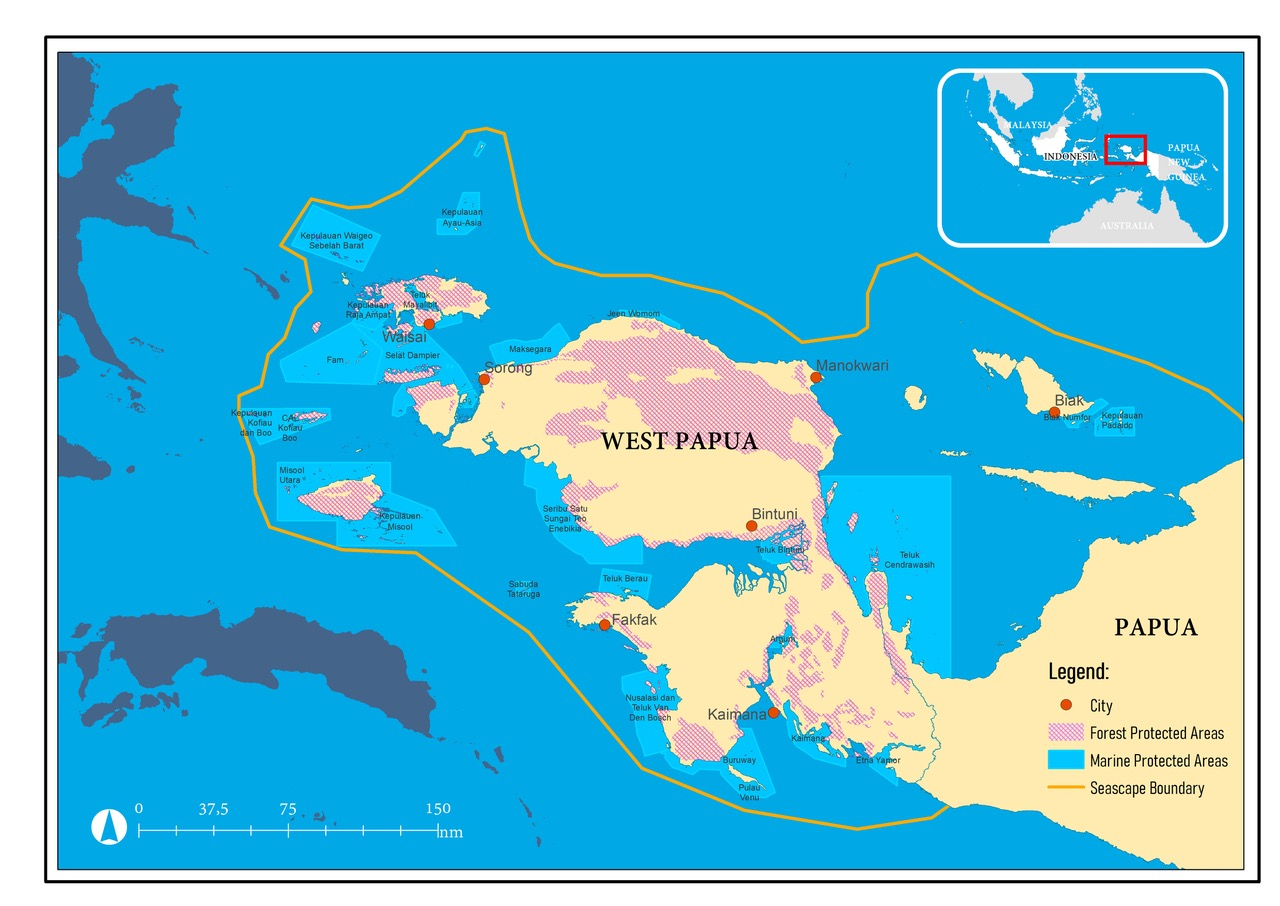
Protected areas in the Bird's Head Peninsula.

As of 2023 Indonesia has over 411 marine protected areas covering an area of 28.4 million ha combined, larger than the U.K. For all their size, these MPAs account for less than 9% of Indonesia's waters. In 2022 the fisheries minister Sakti Wahyu Trenggono declared a target of reaching 32.5 million hectares or 10% of its territorial waters by 2030. From 2030 to 2045, the government plans to triple the marine protected area coverage to 97.5 million hectares (376,000 mi2).

== Other protected areas ==
- Gita Persada Butterfly Park, Sumatra
- Suranadi Nature Recreation Park, Lombok

== See also ==
- Conservation in Indonesia
- Environmental issues in Indonesia
- Heart of Borneo
