= Conservation in Indonesia =

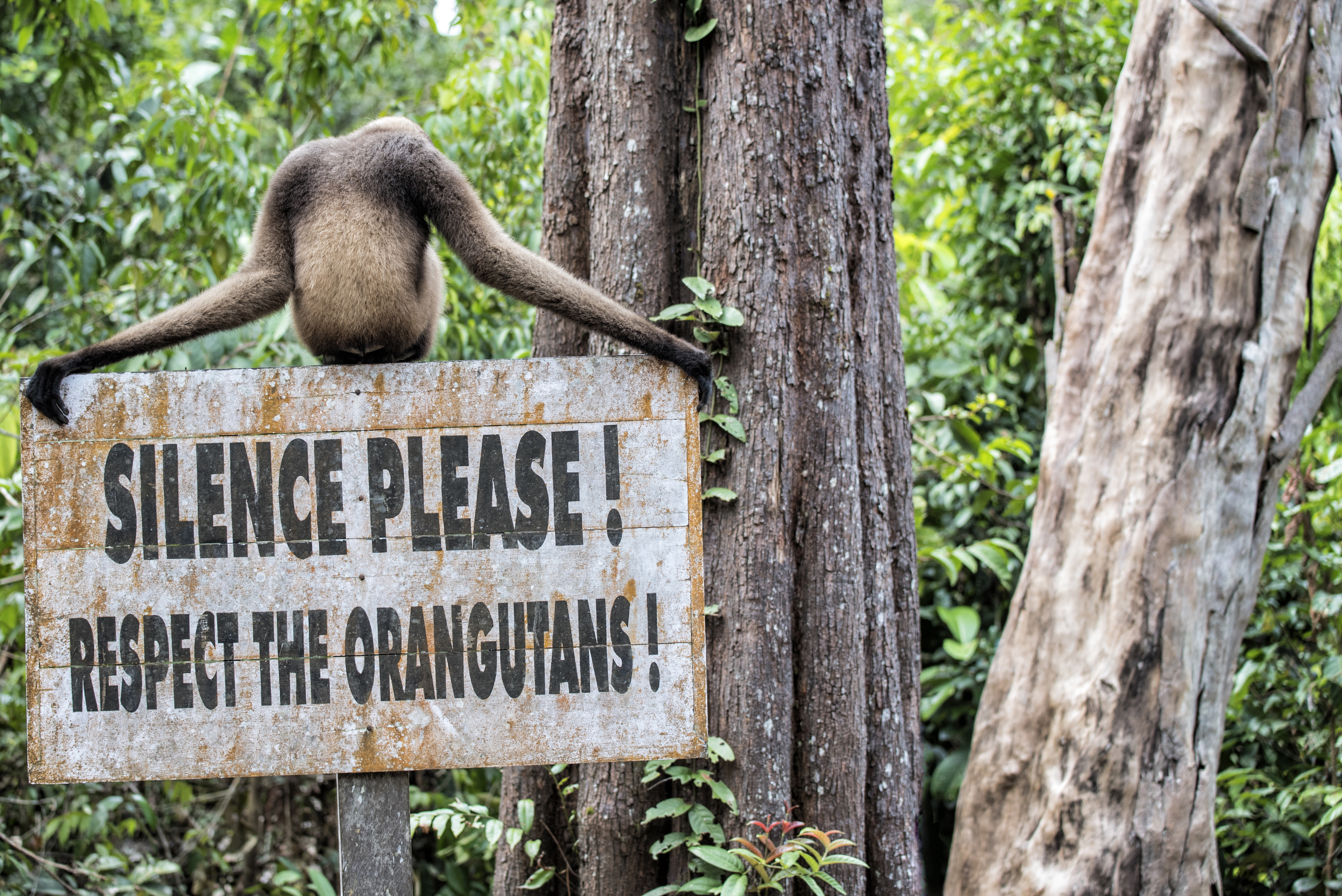
A sign warning not to disturb orangutans in Tanjung Puting National Park

Conservation in Indonesia encompasses efforts to protect the country's unique environment and biodiversity. Indonesia harbours a high rate of endemism and is rich in tropical rainforest and coral reefs.

Traditional forest garden practices have played a role in preserving biodiversity in Indonesia. Formal conservation efforts began in the 19th century during Dutch colonial rule. Following independence, Indonesian conservation has been implemented by the Indonesian government along with grassroots efforts from non-governmental organisations and the cooperation of religious leaders. Indonesia has gazetted 21.3% of its land and 9% of its maritime area as protected areas, with targets to increase these. Implementation of conservation in the country is hampered by deforestation and mining.

== History ==
Teluk Cenderawasih National Park

Research has suggested that traditional forest gardens cultivated by Dayak people in West Kalimantan had a similarly high number of tree species as natural forests, suggesting they have had a role in the conservation of biodiversity.

There has been recognition of the need to conserve the unique wildlife of what is now Indonesia since at least the late 19th century in the Dutch colonial period. Dutch authorities recognised birds as important in controlling agricultural pests. They viewed indigenous peoples as the primary threat to the native environment, which was used to justify strict control over this population, in particular limiting bird-of-paradise hunting. Members of the colonial middle class and elite were nevertheless allowed to hunt by purchasing licenses. Following Indonesian independence, the prior association of conservationism with colonialism led to limited local support.

Much Indonesian conservation is managed using a top-down approach by government agencies. Several non-governmental organisations also operate in Indonesia. From the 1980s onwards, some grassroots conservation initiatives have involved the cooperation of religious leaders and application of Islamic principles, including fatwas.

Indonesia's tropical forests and peatlands are of national and global ecological, climatic and socioeconomic importance. Researchers have recognised the importance of Indonesian conservation in climate change mitigation, given it possesses the largest coverage of mangrove forests of any country, which act as a carbon sink.

Conservation challenges for the country include deforestation, mining, poor coordination between government bodies, and overexploitation. Indonesian conservation is often male-dominated, with women working in the sector facing challenges from cultural gender norms.

== Protected areas ==
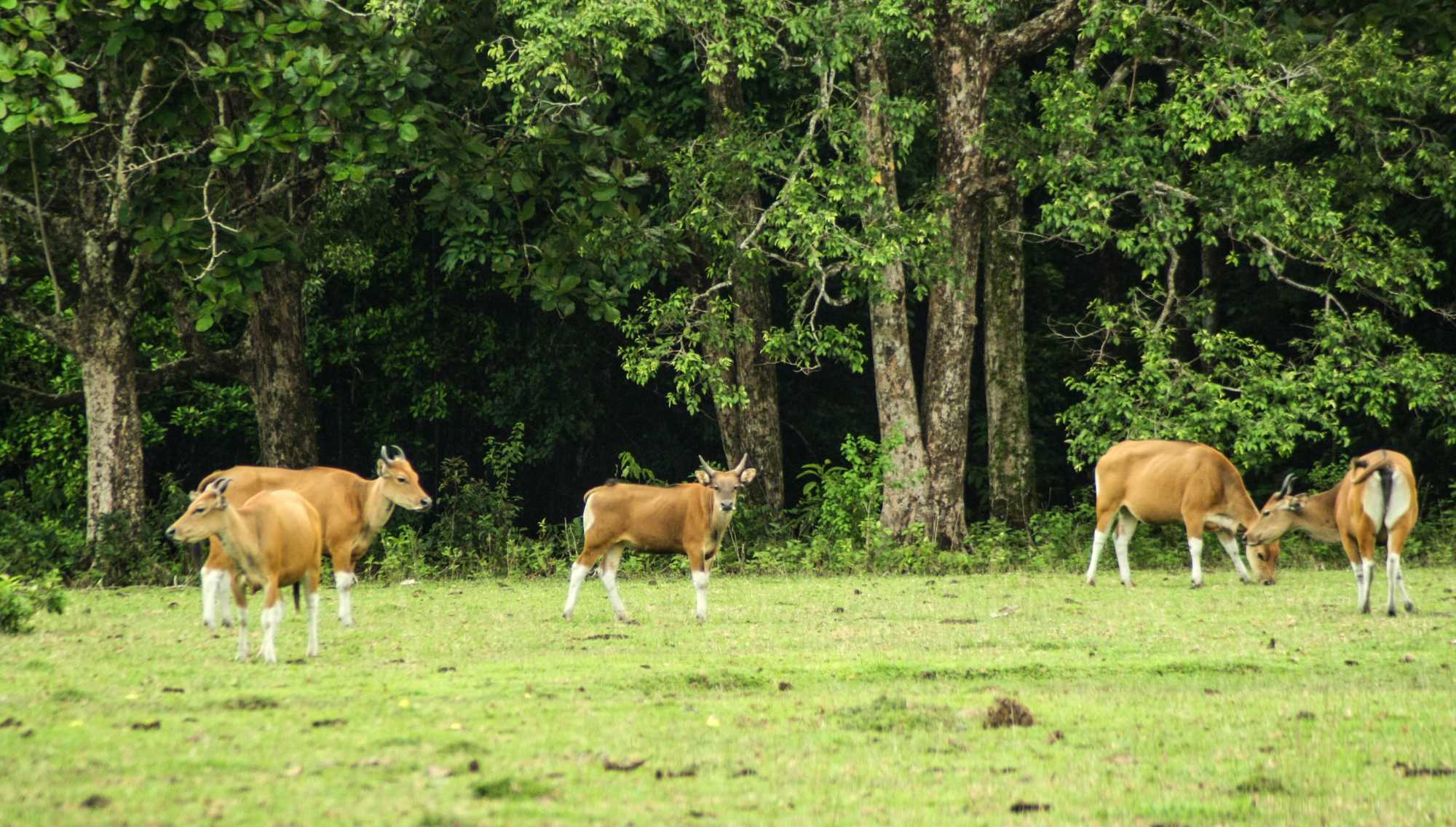
Banteng in Ujung Kulon National Park

As of 2023, the government of Indonesia has gazetted 21.3% of the country's land as protected areas, with the intention of developing a new protected area strategy in line with global post-2020 framework. The country also has 411 marine reserves, or 9% of the country's total maritime area, and has set a target to increase this to 30% by 2045. However, a 2023 study suggested this target is not on track and that existing marine reserves are poorly managed.

Around 390 marine areas are managed in some way by government bodies, communities, and other sectors, with potential for these to be considered other effective area-based conservation measures (OECMs). There is some policy recognition of OECMs but no national mechanism for reporting them.

== See also ==
- List of biosphere reserves of Indonesia
- Environmental issues in Indonesia
