= Makin Group =

Palm oil company from Indonesia

The PT Matahari Kahuripan Indonesia (Makin Group) is a palm oil company from Indonesia. It is based in Jakarta. In Jambi province, Makin Group reportedly operates or used to operate on peatlands.

It has 1.7 million hectares dedicated to oil palm (2009). Within its area, there was illegal commercial land clearing on its area. Makin manages plantations in Sumatera and Kalimantan and runs thirteen palm oil mills.

== See also ==
- Palm oil production in Indonesia
