= List of biosphere reserves of Indonesia =

As of 2019, there are 16 biosphere reserves in Indonesia that are part of World Network of Biosphere Reserves, which consists of 686 reserves globally.

== Biosphere reserves ==
- Betung Kerihun National Park
- Bromo Tengger Semeru National Park including Arjuno-Welirang
- Belambangan Biosphere Reserve
- Giam Siak Kecil-Bukit Batu
- Komodo Biosphere Reserve
- Lore Lindu National Park
- Mount Leuser National Park
- Mount Gede Pangrango National Park
- Rimba Raya Biodiversity Reserve
- Saleh-Moyo-Tambora (Samota) National Park
- Sembilang National Park
- Siberut National Park
- Taka Bonerate National Park
- Tanjung Puting National Park
- Tojo Una-Una Togean National Park
- Wakatobi National Park
