= Buyat Bay =

Bay in Indonesia

Coordinates: 0.8427°N 124.7031°E

Buyat Bay is small bay on the south coast of Minahassa Peninsula on the north of Sulawesi island of Indonesia. Since 1996, Newmont Mining Corporation under its subsidiary company, PT Newmont Minahasa Raya, has been using the bay as the tailing (mine waste) dumping ground for its gold mining activities. In 2004, local people in the area complained several unusual health problems which further suspected Newmont's for breaching the mining waste level regulation to had contaminated the area with hazardous materials. The Indonesian activist group on environment, WALHI, claimed that Newmont has been dumping 2,000 tonnes of mine waste into the bay daily. A legal case between the government of Indonesia versus one of the company's top executive is still ongoing.

== History ==
The bay is located at the southeast side of the northern peninsula arm of Sulawesi island, facing to the Maluku Sea. Buyat is a small bay where local fisherman villages are located. Since 1996 until August 2004, the bay had been used as tailing area for the Mesel Gold Mine, operated by PT Newmont Minahasa Raya, 80%-owned subsidiary company of Newmont Mining Corporation. Tailings from the gold mine are finely ground rock which gold has been recovered.

A pipeline was constructed to transfer the tailings from the gold mine area to the bay extended 900 m to the sea and dumping the material at depth 82 m. In July 2004, several non-governmental organizations started a campaign accusing PT Newmont Minahasa Raya deliberately polluted Buyat Bay, which resulted in adverse health effect of the local residents.

== Pollution ==
In the mid-2004, local fishing community appealed the Indonesian government for independent research to investigate the level of Newmont's mining waste to Buyat Bay. Local fishermen witnessed of sudden increase in fish deaths, unusual swelling in the fish body, the loss of young milkfish and several fish species in the bay area. They also complained for unusual health problem including unexplained skin diseases, tremors, headaches, and unusual swellings on the neck, calves, wrist, buttocks and head. The research then found several heavy metals including arsenic, antimony, mercury and manganese distributions in the area with the peak density around the tailing ground.

In November 2004, WALHI (the Indonesian NGO for environmental issues) together with several non-profit groups (the Indonesian Mining Advocacy Network, the Earth Indonesia, and the Indonesian Center for Environmental Law) compiled a more comprehensive report on Buyat Bay condition, concluding that the bay is polluted by hazardous level of arsenic and mercury, and thus highly risk to the community. Arsenic pollution from the Buyat Bay seabed sediment samples revealed as high as 666 mg/kg arsenic level (hundred times than the ASEAN Marine Water Quality Criteria of only 50 mg/kg) and on average over 1000 μg/kg mercury level (the same standard defines 400 μg/kg level). Compared to natural control samples from sites not affected by mine waste dumping, the study also concluded that the arsenic and mercury levels were not natural and the only possible source comes from the Newmont's mine waste dumping. Mercury and arsenic accumulated in different living organisms in Buyat Bay including fish, consumed daily by the local people. Human health was at risk and the report recommended the fish consumption should be significantly reduced and the possibility of relocation of local people to other areas.

In 1994, Newmont's Environmental Impact Assessment stated a thermocline layer at 50–70 meters depth as a barrier to keep tailings from mixing and spreading in Buyat Bay. Despite Newmont's claim, WALHI did not find the thermocline ocean layer.

== Legal case ==
In August 2004, the Indonesian Ministry of Environment filed a US$133.6 million civil lawsuit against Newmont, claiming tailings from the company's Minahasa Raya mine polluted Buyat Bay in the North Sulawesi province, causing nearby villagers to become seriously ill and contaminating local fish stocks. Newmont denied the allegations, arguing that the illnesses had more to do with poor hygiene and poverty. On November 15, 2005, a South Jakarta court dismissed the suit on technical grounds, saying the government had breached the terms of its contract with Newmont when it took legal action before seeking arbitration. Environmentalists urged for the suit to be appealed, but on December 1, 2005, Environment Minister Rachmat Witoelar said the government expected to reach an out-of-court settlement with Newmont's local subsidiary. "By negotiating a settlement, we hope to be able to quickly compensate people living near the mine," he said. The government negotiating team was led by chief Economics Minister Aburizal Bakrie. On February 16, 2006, the Indonesian government announced it would settle the civil suit for US$30 million to be paid over the next 10 years. The agreement also includes increased scientific monitoring and enhanced community development programs for the North Sulawesi province. Newmont, with a market value of US$25 billion, is expected to make US$5 billion in revenues for 2006.

Though the civil suit was dismissed, there is still pending a criminal suit against Newmont's top U.S. executive in Indonesia, Richard Ness, on charges stemming from the same allegations. His trial began in August 2005— if convicted, Ness faces up to 10 years in prison. Prosecutors have recommended financial penalties of US$110,000 for Newmont and US$55,000 for Ness.

On April 24, 2007, Richard Ness was cleared of all charges relating to the alleged pollution in Buyat Bay. Furthermore, the Indonesian court held that Buyat Bay was not polluted and that Newmont's local subsidiary was in compliance with all environmental regulations and permits for the entirety of its operation from 1996 to 2004.

== Media depiction ==
A documentary film entitled Bye Bye Buyat was made in 2006 and it won the Indonesia's top film award, Indonesian Film Festival in the same year. Newmont Mining Corp. objected to the documentary saying that the film interferes with the controversial Richard Ness pollution trial.

== See also ==
- Environmental issues in Indonesia
- Industrial disasters
