= Palm oil production in Indonesia =

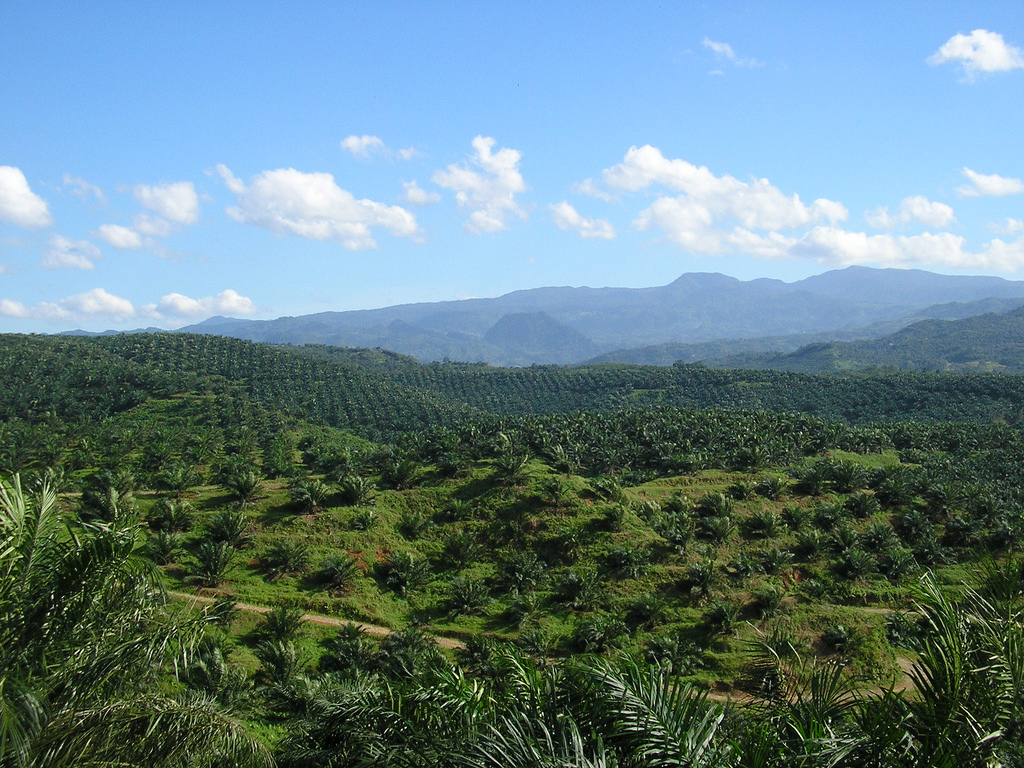
A palm oil plantation in Cigudeg, Bogor Regency, West Java.

Palm oil production is important to the economy of Indonesia as the country is the world's biggest producer and consumer of the commodity, providing about half of the world's supply. In 2016, Indonesia produced over 34.6 million metric tons (34,100,000 long tons; 38,100,000 short tons) of palm oil, and exported 25.1 million metric tons (24,700,000 long tons; 27,700,000 short tons) of it. Oil palm plantations stretch across at least 12 million hectares (30 million acres). There are several different types of plantations, including small, privately owned plantations, and larger, state-owned plantations. There are a variety of health, environmental, and societal impacts that result from the production of palm oil in Indonesia. A recent publication by the NGO Rainforest Action Network (RAN) indicates that the use of palm oil by some of the biggest chocolate and snacks' producers is increasing this problem.

In addition to servicing traditional markets, Indonesia is looking to put more effort into producing biodiesel. China and India are the major importers of palm oil, accounting for more than a third of global palm oil imports. Looking at Indonesia's GHG emissions breakdown, climate change mitigation will mainly come from controlling forest fires and peatland conservation. REDD+ (Reducing Emissions from Deforestation and Forest Degradation in Developing Countries) will be 'an important component of the NDC target from [the] land-use sector'. This implies that there will need to be large economic incentives and inputs from outside resources to ensure that land is conserved.

== Deforestation ==
As late as 1900, Indonesia was still a densely forested country: forests represented 84 percent of the total land area. Deforestation intensified in the 1970s and has accelerated further since then. The estimated forest cover of 170 million hectares (420 million acres) around 1900 decreased to less than 100 million hectares (250 million acres) by the end of the 20th century. Of the total logging in Indonesia, up to 80% is reported to be performed illegally.

Forests are often cleared for palm oil industries. Typically, the company that has usage rights for the land will contract individuals to burn the supposedly "degraded" forest, thereby avoiding direct responsibility for fires, which become more likely when peatland is deforested.

Forest fires often destroy high capacity carbon sinks, including old-growth rainforest and peatlands. In May 2011, Indonesia declared a moratorium on new logging contracts to help combat this. This appeared to be ineffective in the short-term, as the rate of deforestation continued to increase. By 2012, Indonesia had surpassed the rate of deforestation in Brazil, and become the fastest forest clearing nation in the world. However, it is unclear about the current comparative deforestation rates between Indonesia and Brazil because new political leadership in Brazil has recently increased deforestation dramatically.

Domestically, there has been some effort to crack down against illegal slash and burn practices. A Peatland Restoration Agency was also formed in 2015 under President Joko Widodo. In 2018, the government no longer granted licenses for deforestation for palm oil plantations. It is unclear as to how effective these laws are due to corruption, poor enforcement and loopholes in some of these policies.

== Production ==
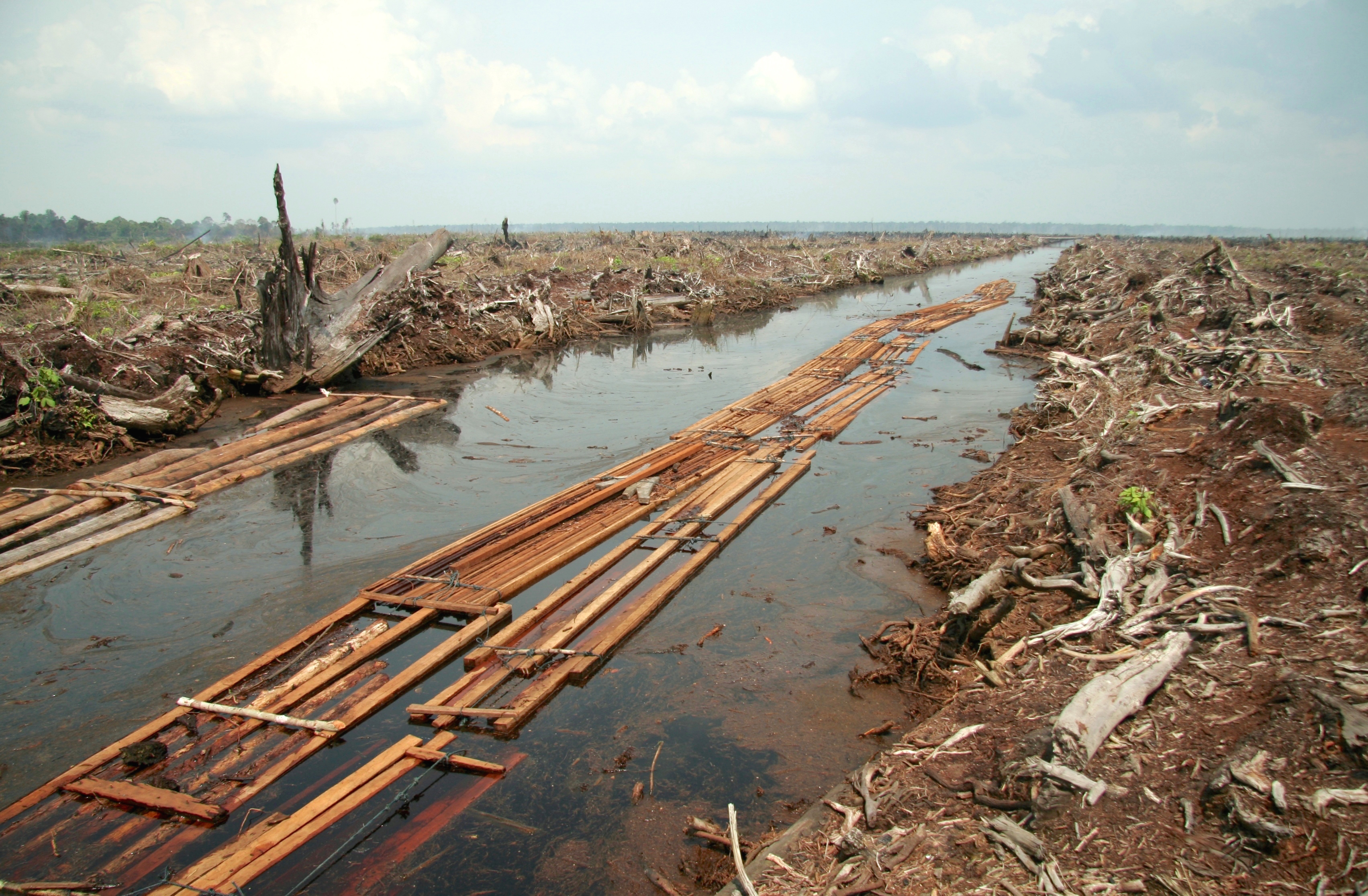
The remains of a peat forest in Indragiri Hulu, Riau Province, Indonesia to make way for oil palm plantation.

Production of palm oil in Indonesia has, since 1964, recorded a phenomenal increase from 157,000 metric tons (155,000 long tons; 173,000 short tons) to 41.5 million metric tons (40,800,000 long tons; 45,700,000 short tons) in 2018 and a total of 51 million metric tons (50,000,000 long tons; 56,000,000 short tons) will be needed in 2025 to sustain international and domestic demands. Palm oil accounts for 11% of Indonesia's export earnings of $5.7bn. Maintaining its status as the world's largest producer of palm oil, Indonesia has projected a figure of 40 million metric tons (39,000,000 long tons; 44,000,000 short tons) by 2020. In this context, the global production figure given by the Food and Agriculture Organization (FAO) was 50 million metric tons (49,000,000 long tons; 55,000,000 short tons) for 2012, equivalent to double of the 2002 production. This increase is also reflected in increases of Indonesia's production of palm oil for the same period, from 10.300 million metric tons (10,137,000 long tons; 11,354,000 short tons) in 2002 and 28.50 million metric tons (28,050,000 long tons; 31,420,000 short tons) in 2012. In April 2022, President Joko Widodo announced that the country will effectively ban palm oil exports starting 28 April, until further notice. The policy is said to guarantee availability of affordable cooking oil in the domestic market. In return, this has flustered global markets and sent the commodity's price to historic highs.

Table 1. Oil Palm Area and Palm Oil Production by Type of Palm Oil Plantation
Palm Oil Area (million of hectares (acres))					Palm Oil Production (million of metric tonnes (long tons; short tons))			
Year	Small-Holders	State Owned	Private Estates	Total	Small-Holders	State Owned	Private estates	Total
1970	–	0.09 (0.22)	0.05 (0.12)	0.13 (0.32)	-	0.15 (0.15; 0.17)	0.07 (0.069; 0.077)	0.22 (0.22; 0.24)
1980	0.01 (0.025)	0.20 (0.49)	0.09 (0.22)	0.29 (0.72)	0	0.50 (0.49; 0.55)	0.22 (0.22; 0.24)	0.72 (0.71; 0.79)
1990	0.29 (0.72)	0.37 (0.91)	0.46 (1.1)	1.13 (2.8)	0.38 (0.37; 0.42)	1.25 (1.23; 1.38)	0.79 (0.78; 0.87)	2.41 (2.37; 2.66)
2000	1.17 (2.9)	0.59 (1.5)	2.40 (5.9)	4.16 (10.3)	1.91 (1.88; 2.11)	1.46 (1.44; 1.61)	3.63 (3.57; 4.00)	7.00 (6.89; 7.72)
2005	2.36 (5.8)	0.53 (1.3)	2.57 (6.4)	5.45 (13.5)	4.50 (4.43; 4.96)	1.45 (1.43; 1.60)	5.91 (5.82; 6.51)	11.86 (11.67; 13.07)
2010	3.31 (8.2)	0.62 (1.5)	3.89 (9.6)	7.82 (19.3)	7.77 (7.65; 8.56)	2.09 (2.06; 2.30)	9.98 (9.82; 11.00)	19.84 (19.53; 21.87)

The entire oil production is derived from Indonesia's rainforest which ranks third in the world, the other two being in the Amazon and Congo basins. The three main business models for palm oil production in Indonesia are private large scale plantations, nucleus estate smallholders, and independent smallholders. The breakdown of palm oil area and production by type of palm oil plantation is shown in Table 1. Palm trees that were planted about 25 years ago have an annual average production rate of 4-metric-ton-per-hectare of oil (1.6 long ton/acre; 1.8 short ton/acre)

Indonesia is considering plans to increase production this by introducing newer varieties which could double production rate per hectare (acre).

Borneo and Sumatra are the two islands that account for 96% of Indonesia's palm oil production. As of 2011, there were 7.8 million hectares (19 million acres) of palm oil plantations, with 6.1 million hectares (15 million acres) of these being productive plantations under harvest, thus making Indonesia the global leader in crude palm oil (CPO) production. According to World Bank reports, nearly 50% of CPO produced in the country is exported in an unprocessed form, while the remaining is processed into cooking oil, about half of which is exported, while the rest is consumed locally. The unprocessed CPO are exported to Pasir Gudang in Johor, Malaysia, before the refined palm oil and palm kernel oil are exported worldwide.

The crude palm oil production system is vital to the economy of Indonesia and has many domestic and foreign uses. It provides a major export source through food and for industrial use. It is also used for domestic food, biodiesel, and biofuel. It is estimated that the population of Indonesia will grow to 285 million people in 2025 which will lead to an increased domestic demand for vegetable oil. In addition, other domestic industrial uses of palm oil are to support the pharmaceutical, cosmetic, and chemical industries.

== Uses ==
Palm oil is an essential ingredient for the food industry, used as a cooking oil or in the production of processed foods (such as many types of chocolates, biscuits, chewing gum...) and for the manufacture of cosmetic and hygiene products (soaps, lipstick, washing powder...). It is also valuable as a lubricant in industrial production or for the energy sector for the production of biodiesel.

=== Biofuel ===
Table 2. Projections for Future Demand of Crude Palm Oil
Demand	2015	2016	2020	2025
Food	5.6	5.8	6.3	6.9
Industrial				
Biodiesel	3.9	5.0	8.6	11.2
Other	1.2	1.3	1.6	2.0
Export	23.7	24.5	27.4	31.0

Over the past few years an interest in biofuel has increased as a potential clean energy source, it has become a primary use for domestic crude palm oil. As seen in table 3, domestic use of biodiesel is expected to see the most growth of 7.3% by 2025. The Indonesia government has been interested in growing biofuel plantations to decrease the countries reliance on fossil fuels. It is predicted that in 2025, biofuel will account for 25% of Indonesians national energy mix.

Biodiesel is created using a transesterification process that converts the triglycerides in the crude palm oil into esters to be used in biofuel production. This process has been shown to have a biodiesel yield of 93.6%.

== Companies ==
Major local and global companies are building mills and refineries, including PT Astra Agro Lestari Terbuka (150,000 metric tons per year (150,000 long tons per year; 170,000 short tons per year) biodiesel refinery), PT Bakrie Group (a biodiesel factory and new plantations), Surya Dumai Group (biodiesel refinery).

Cargill (sometimes operating through CTP Holdings of Singapore) is building new refineries and mills in Malaysia and Indonesia, expanding its Rotterdam refinery to handle 300,000 metric tons (300,000 long tons; 330,000 short tons)/year of palm oil, acquiring plantations in Sumatra, Kalimantan, and Papua New Guinea.

Robert Kuok's Wilmar International Limited has plantations and 25 refineries across Indonesia, to supply feedstock to the new biodiesel refineries of Singapore, Riau, Indonesia and Rotterdam.

Musim Mas Group has plantations and refineries in Malaysia and Indonesia – Kalimantan, Medan etc. although they are headquartered in Singapore.

Marihat Research Station (MRS), nowadays known as RISPA and located in Medan, is the first research centre for Palm Oil Plantation for Indonesia. One of its well-known experts in soil, who has now retired, was Ir. Petrus Purba.

In August 2011, the governor of Aceh issued a permit for Indonesian palm oil firm PT Kallista Alam to develop around 1,600 hectares (4,000 acres) in Tripa. Indonesian palm oil producer Triputra Agro Persada will reportedly increase its planted area by about two-thirds from 2013 by 2015.

== Environmental impact ==
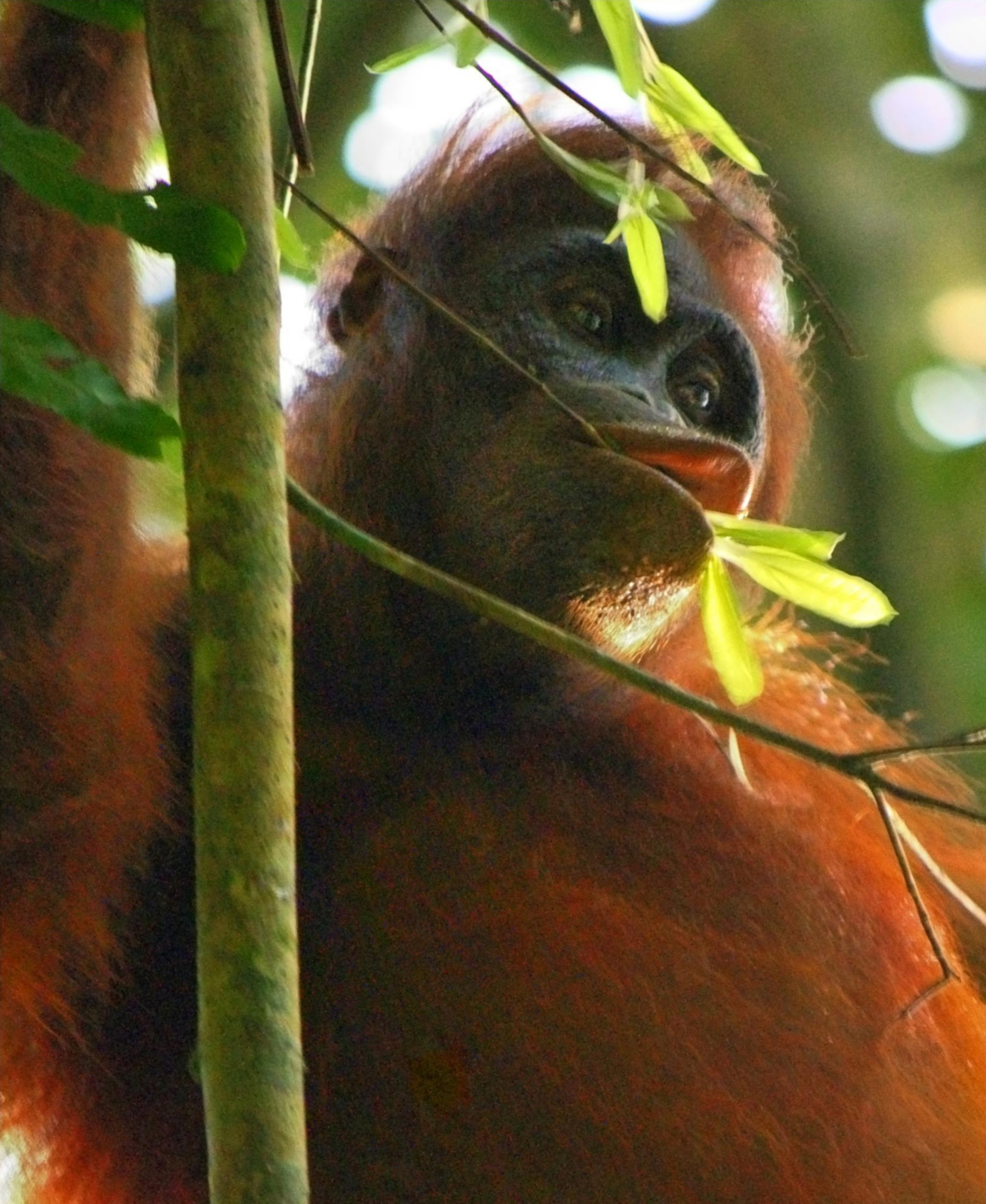
Wild orangutan spotted in Kutai National Park, Borneo, Indonesia.

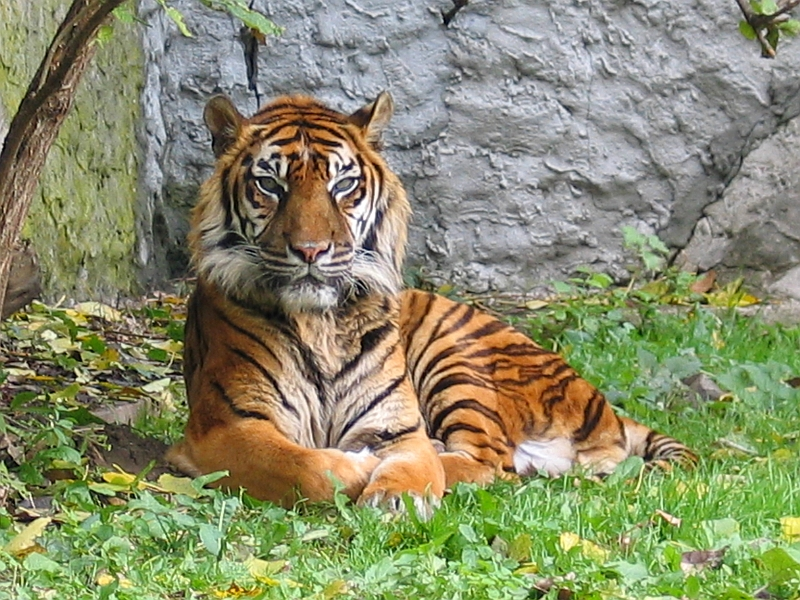
Sumatran tiger (Panthera tigris)

=== Logging effects and deforestation ===
Since agricultural land is limited, to plant monocultures of oil palms, land used for other cultivations or the tropical forest need to be cleared. Of the total logging in Indonesia, up to 80% is reported to be performed illegally. A major environmental threat is then the destruction of rainforests in Indonesia, which was estimated at 840 thousand hectares (2,100,000 acres) of primary forest per year from 2000 to 2012. From 1990 to 2005, 108,110 square miles (280,000 square kilometres) of Indonesian forest were taken down from logging, 77% of this forest had never even been touched.

Deforestation also makes Indonesia one of the biggest emitters of greenhouse gases. Carbon dioxide (CO_{2}) is released in the atmosphere massively with the cutting of tropical peatlands, which are carbon sinks, according to Greenpeace. Deforestation is also caused by illegal forest fires to clear land for palm oil plantations. According to WWF for example, in 1997 around 0.81 to 2.57 billion metric tons (800,000,000 to 2.53×10^{9} long tons; 890,000,000 to 2.83×10^{9} short tons) of carbon were released by the fires which represented "13–40% of the mean annual global carbon emissions from fossil fuels that year". As of 2013, Indonesia ranked number eight among countries worldwide for overall greenhouse gas emissions. According to the World Resources Institute, 65.5% of these greenhouse gas emissions can be attributed to land use change and forestry; the palm oil industry in Indonesia is a major contributing factor towards this trend.

Industrial palm tree plantations also impacts negatively the quality of soils, water and the air because they often rely on the use of agrochemicals products, such as pesticides or fertilizers.

=== Carbon sinks ===
The drainage, burning, and plantation building on former peat lands releases large quantities of carbon dioxide, so negating their value as so-called 'carbon sinks' (stores of carbon). The carbon sinks "store more carbon per unit area than any other ecosystem in the world". One study found that destroying the carbon sink peat bogs in Southeast Asia could release as much carbon as nine years of fossil fuel that is used globally. A recent study by Rahman et al. (2018) found that when forest is converted to oil plam plantation, Soil Organic Carbon (SOC) stocks declined by 42%, 24% and 18% after 29, 39 and 49 years of conversion respectively.

=== Air pollution ===
Palm Oil production is a source of air pollution in Indonesia, mainly due to the use of slash-and-burn method to clear out forests for palm oil plantations. The areas that are typically being cleared out are rainforests, which have very carbon rich forest floors are known as peatlands. The carbon-rich soil of the peatlands make them very flammable. When peatlands are burned, they release a large amount of CO_{2} along with black carbon, an extremely dangerous type of particulate matter. Along with particulate matter, the smoke from the fires can release toxic gases that can spread over large areas and the fires are not easy to put out in remote areas, causing harm to both animal life and human populations. As a result of the large fires, a recurring phenomenon typically between July and October or during El Nino called the Southeast Asian haze occurs. This is an event where air quality becomes extremely dangerous and can cause adverse health outcomes, have negative environmental, and economic impacts.

=== Soil and water pollution ===
2.5 metric tons (2.5 long tons; 2.8 short tons) of effluent or liquid waste is made for every metric ton (0.98 long tons; 1.1 short tons) of palm oil that is produced. This effluent affects freshwater furthermore affecting downstream wildlife and humans. Pesticides and fertilizers can further cause issues for downstream water pollution.

=== Land erosion ===
A majority of Indonesia's palm oil plantations are on steep slopes, causing "increased flooding and silt deposits in rivers and ports". Repair of infrastructures such as roads and housing are effects of land erosion to local communities.

=== Animals ===
Many animals native to Southeast Asia and Indonesia are impacted by the effects of the palm oil industry and deforestation often facing threats of extinction. Deforestation entails a reduction in biodiversity and an alteration of ecosystems which causes the destruction of the habitats of endangered species such as Borneo pygmy elephants, Sumatran elephants, Sumatran tigers, Sumatran rhinoceroses, Malayan sun bear and the various species of orangutan that can be found only on the forests of Borneo and Sumatra. Some of these animals such as the orangutan are arboreal and try to stay in the trees, often being burned alive during slash and burn of forests. Other animals like the orangutans are introduced to new threats as palm oil fields increase in size. Palm oil plantations in Sumatra and Borneo are one of the main areas where reticulated and blood pythons are sourced for the exotic leather industry.

=== Remedial measures ===
A government moratorium on the clearing of new forest was effective from 2011 to 2015.

The Indonesian Palm Oil Board has planned to adopt new planting materials on the older plantations which could double yields compared to the present annual rate of 4-metric-ton-per-hectare of oil (1.6 long ton/acre; 1.8 short ton/acre). In addition, the government will encourage development of degraded lands found suitable to grow palm trees. This area is reported to be 14 million hectares (35 million acres) in the four provinces of Kalimantan, on the Indonesian part of the Borneo island.

In 2018, the Indonesian president signed a moratorium on new palm oil development that will last three years. In this moratorium, opening of new palm oil plantations will be delayed to reduce conflicts, as well as requiring all central and provincial governments to re-evaluate current permits.

== Impacts on local communities ==
The expansion of the palm oil industry is driven by its profitability, and it has the potential to develop new jobs and improve the standards of living of people and small-holders when conducted sustainably. According to the UNDP, there are about 16 million jobs that depend on the palm oil sector.

On the other side, deforestation (for example in Borneo) for oil palm plantation development also endangers indigenous tribes and local communities as it entails the destruction of living spaces or land appropriation. For example, in regions like Kalimantan, the local livelihoods of Dayak communities and their traditions of shifting cultivation, are undermined by the development of palm oil production and monocultures. This often results in human rights violations and confrontation between large-scale producers and local communities whose land is appropriated. Colchester, for example, found that in 2010, there had been more than 630 land disputes linked to oil palm production in Indonesia.

The industry of palm oil also causes pollution of air and water which increase health risks to the populations of Indonesia. The use of slash-and-burn techniques to clear land for oil palm cultivation has led to widespread regional haze episodes impacting countries throughout Southeast Asia. These haze episodes have been linked to excess premature deaths, respiratory illness and cardiac disease. Infants and children are particularly vulnerable to negative health impacts from these exposures. The 2015 Southeast Asian Haze episode is estimated to have caused approximately 103,300 excess deaths in Indonesia, Malaysia and Singapore according to mortality models.

Similarly, in Papua, palm oil expansion has recently led to large scale clearing of customary land belonging to Indigenous Papuan communities.

== Social implications ==
The palm oil industry in Indonesia has been shown to have contributed to state revenue, provide employment for people in rural areas, and increase farmers income. However, these benefits only seem to be seen with more experienced plantations and farmers, so the industry tends to favor migrant smallholders rather than the indigenous people. The indigenous people tend to see more negative social impacts such as food insecurity, human rights abuse, land disputes, and disregard for the local environment.

The Indonesian scientist Prof. Dr. Bambang Hero Saharjo is a leading authority on peatland fires and has produced evidence for over 500 criminal trials against firms that have been accused of using illegal methods to clear peatland for crops such as palm oil. For his work in continuing to produce evidence in the face of threats and intimidation he received the 2019 John Maddox prize from the charity Sense about Science.

=== Human rights ===
The palm oil industry is growing in industry need and output, and palm oil and palm-based ingredients are found in more than 50 percent of common consumer products, from shampoo and lipstick to packaged bread and ice cream. Indonesia is the largest producer of palm oil across the world and is rapidly expanding its plantations and workforce to face a growing global demand. In attempting to meet this demand, systemic human rights violations are consistently traced to Indonesian palm oil producers, including forced labor and child labor, gender discrimination, and worker exploitation.

=== Child labor ===
While Indonesian law prohibits child labour in work that is "harmful to the health, safety, or morals of children", children between the ages of 13 and 15 are permitted to do what is called "light work", or work that does not pose a risk to a child's mental, physical, or social development. While children are rarely employed by palm oil plantations, they are often working there, helping their fathers and mothers meet their targets to receive full wages. Children often work in the fields and face the risk of injury from chemical exposure, carrying heavy loads, and dangerous farming practices.

=== Worker exploitation and forced labor ===
While Indonesia has legal requirements regarding hours worked per week and overtime, minimum wages are set by province, and in North Sumatra and Central Kalimantan, the provinces were plantations are located, these minimum wages are insufficient to meet a family's needs. Plantation workers are paid using a two-pronged system based on time worked and worker output. Workers are given "output targets" and if these targets are met, workers receive their full pay If they are not met, the worker may lose a portion of his salary or annual bonus, regardless of the amount of time worked. These targets are set by individual company and are not regulated. It has also been found that harvesters regularly work longer than the legal limit, often working 10–12 hours a day. The legal limit in Indonesia is 40 hours per week.

=== Dangerous working conditions ===
Pesticide and herbicide use is a common practice among palm oil plantations, including paraquat, an herbicide banned throughout Europe. Personal protective equipment is not always provided to workers. Some companies in Indonesia do not provide any equipment, while others do not replace the equipment after excessive use. Workers are found to have no knowledge or information regarding the health risks posed by the chemicals they use.

=== Environmental health impacts and health rights violations ===
In Sumatra, there are a lot of fires from palm oil production and it has seen particulate pollution double over the past two decades with the rise of the palm oil industry. Particulate pollution has had an impact on life expectancy in the area with 0.7 predicted years life lost due to pollution two decades ago to a predicted 2.4 years of life lost now. Chemicals posing major health risks like Nitrogen oxides (NO_{X}) and Carbon monoxides (CO) are also released during peatland fires. A study done in 2015 showed that in Central Kalimantan the particulate pollution and toxic gases released by peatland fires was so severe that 33% of deaths due to cardiovascular disease that year were attributed to the poor air quality. Studies have also suggested that Indonesian palm oil workers are at an increased risk of developing musculoskeletal disorders and infectious diseases like malaria and worm infections due to extensive outdoor labor, stress and mental disorders, and pesticide and herbicide exposure. A company called Wilmar in Indonesia tests employees' blood for chemical exposure to check for abnormalities. While workers will be told if they have "abnormal" blood, they however do not receive a copy of the results or any further explanation. Wilmar addressed the situation by moving employees that had blood abnormalities to different tasks, but never gave an explanation as to why this had been done. This has been found to cause heightened anxiety among plantation workers about their health.

=== Gender discrimination ===
Women are particularly vulnerable to abuses. In Indonesia, women are often hired under casual arrangements, exempting them from permanent employment, health insurance, pensions, and other social security benefits. One of women's main roles on plantations is herbicide, pesticide, and fertilizer application, placing these women at a higher risk for chemical toxicity and other harms. Women are often unpaid for some of their work, including collecting fruit from the ground during harvests, for they are often also helping their husbands meet their targets to ensure the family receives the husband's full salary.

== Sustainable palm oil ==
In response to critiques on the industry by environmental and human rights group, efforts are made towards more sustainability of the industry. According to the Roundtable on Sustainable Palm Oil (RSPO), that applies to palm oils which are produced to increase the food supply while keeping in mind the goals to "safeguard social interests, communities and workers" or to "protect the environment and wildlife" for example.

In 2011, Indonesia Sustainable Palm Oil System (ISPO) was introduced. It is a mandatory certification scheme to ensure the quality and the respect of norms regarding the environment, workers and respect of local populations that should apply to all producers.

The Roundtable on Sustainable Palm Oil (RSPO) is also active in the region in providing certifications of sustainability for the produces who match the standards.

== See also ==
- Biodiesel in Indonesia
- Council of Palm Oil Producing Countries
- Deforestation in Indonesia
- Environmental issues in Indonesia
- Palm oil production in Malaysia
- Pig Feast (2026 film)
- List of Goods Produced by Child Labor or Forced Labor
