= Bambang Hero Saharjo =

Indonesian forest fire researcher

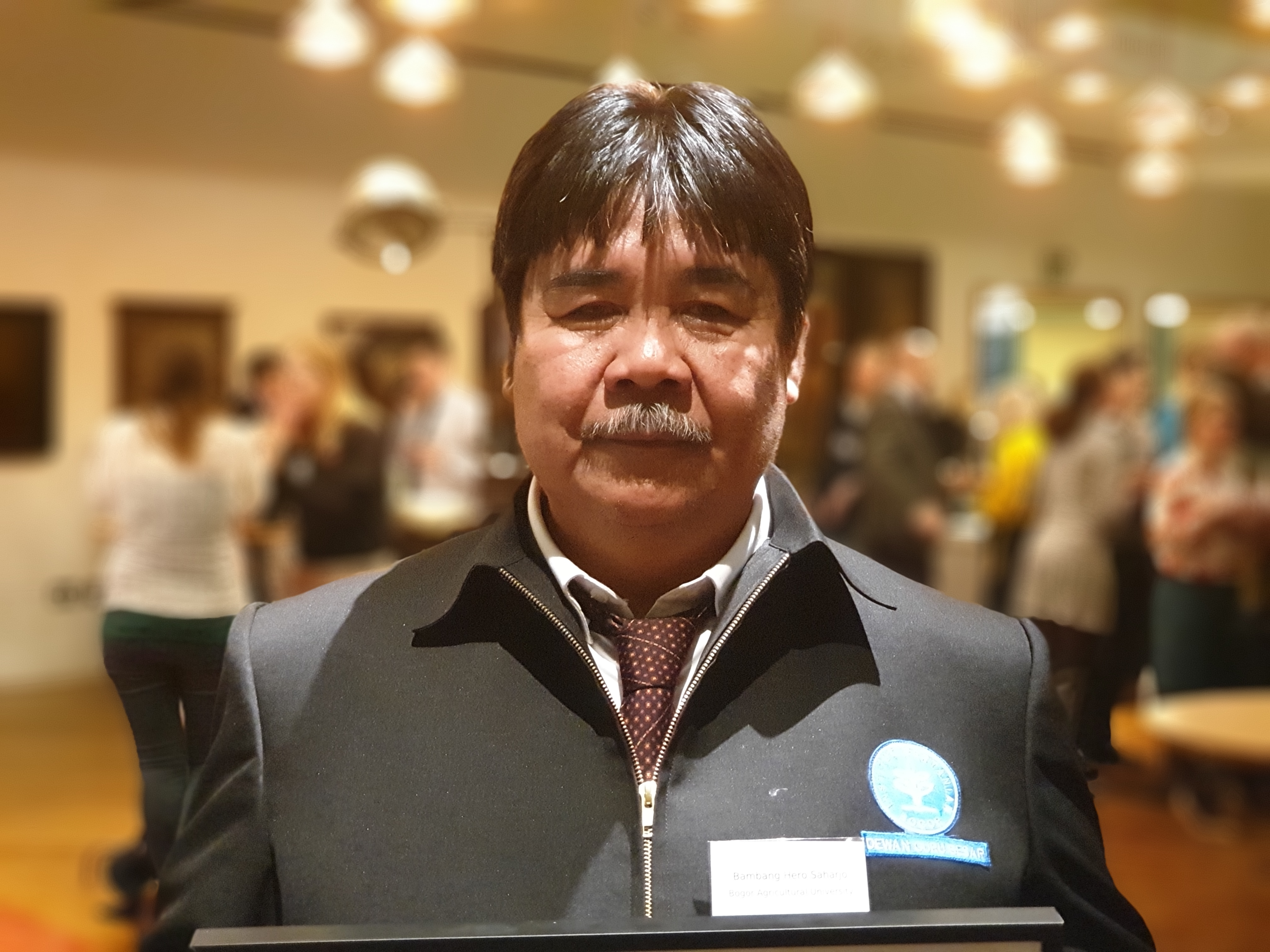
- Bambang Hero Saharjo at the Sense About Science John Maddox prize ceremony 2019
- Occupation: Forest fire researcher
- Known for: Research to stop Indonesian forest fires

Dr. Bambang Hero Saharjo is an Indonesian fire forensics specialist and Professor of the Environment and Forest Fires at Bogor Agricultural University. In 2019, he won the Sense About Science John Maddox award for his work to prevent companies, particularly those of the palm oil industry, from using illegal methods of land clearance in Indonesia.

Saharjo has produced evidence for criminal trials against firms that have been accused of using illegal methods to clear peatland for crops such as palm oil. He has been an expert witness in over 500 cases since 2000, for which he has faced harassment, intimidation, legal action and death threats. In 2018, a multibillion lawsuit by the palm oil industry against him was dropped, about which he said "I was criminalized for presenting evidence and [threatened with a multibillion dollar lawsuit] by palm oil companies that had been found guilty of preparing to plant palms by burning down 1,000 hectares of peatland. Eventually, the lawsuit was rejected and I am free." According to the Guardian, the fires cause annual environmental damage of $10 billion, respiratory problems for children, and produce 1 billion tons of carbon dioxide emissions every season.

Saharjo has published over 50 papers to date and his work has been widely cited in academic literature on the topic. In November 2019, Saharjo was awarded the Sense About Science John Maddox prize for researchers who take personal risks in the course of their scientific work. He told the Times that "I have spent years alone, working in the field. Now I’m very happy because I’m not alone. I have supporters. So it has made me very powerful, to fight this environmental destruction.”
