= Gita Persada Butterfly Park =

- Interactive map of Gita Persada Butterfly Park
- 5°25′12″S 105°11′19″E
- Location: Bandar Lampung, Indonesia
- No. of species: 100+ species of butterflies

Gita Persada Butterfly Park (Indonesian: Taman Kupu-Kupu Gita Persada) is a butterfly house in Bandar Lampung, Indonesia. It was founded in 1997 by Anshori Djausal and Herawati Soekardi in an effort to preserve and protect Sumatran butterfly species from extinction. Increasing environmental issues such as Deforestation in Indonesia prompted the founders to establish this park with the hope that it would serve as a model for butterfly conservation. The park is located at the southern tip of Sumatra at the foot of Mount Betung, at the elevation of 460 m (1,510 ft) about fifteen minutes from Bandar Lampung. The park, located in Wan Abdul Rachman Great Forest Park, has an area of 4.8 hectares (12 acres). As of 2011, the park houses about 160 species of Sumatran butterflies. Some rare species protected by the Indonesian government that can be found in this park are Graphium agamemnon and Troides helena.
