= Operation Haze =

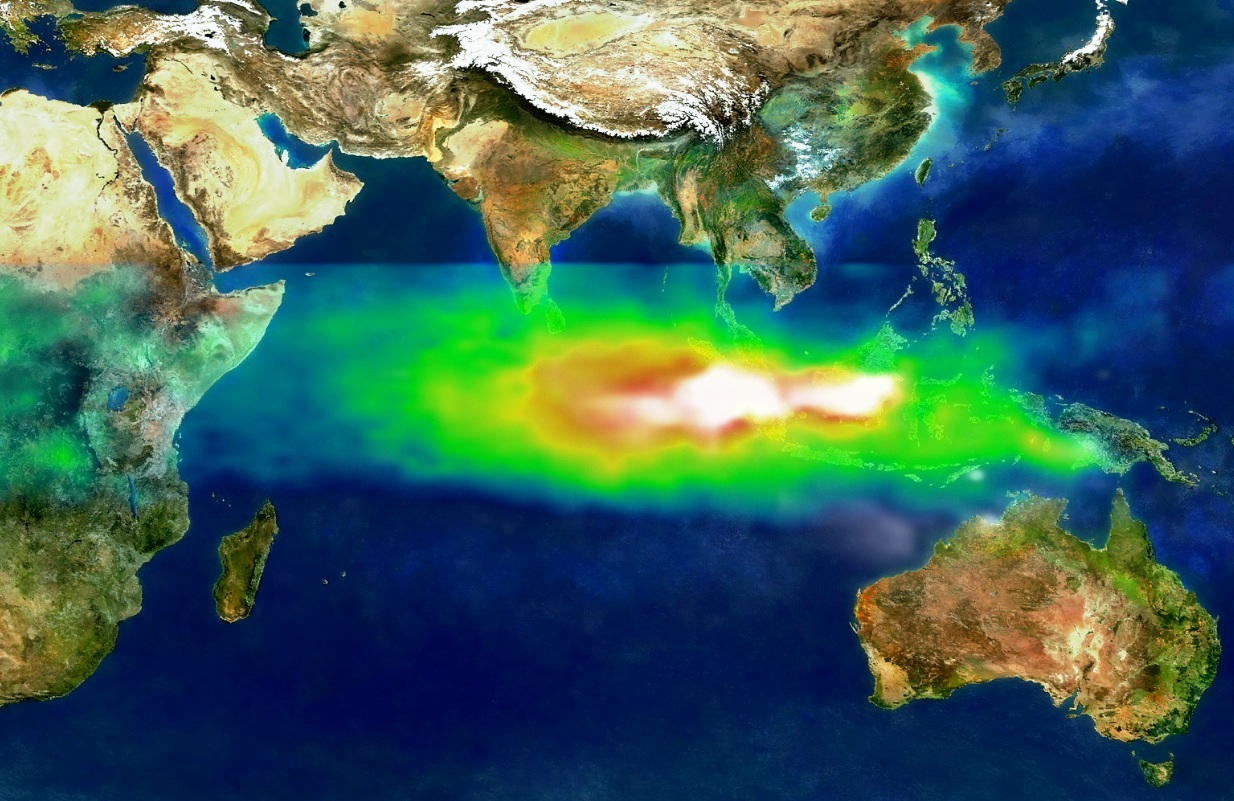
Air pollution over Southeast Asia in October 1997

Operation Haze is the biggest cross-border firefighting mission in history that involved teams of Malaysian firefighters going across to Indonesia to assist with putting out major fires that were causing severe haze across Southeast Asia.

== History ==
The haze first became a considerable disruption to daily life in Malaysia in April 1983. The cause of the haze is uncertain, which has led to speculation that suspended ash particulates from volcanic eruptions, suspended smoke particulates from large-scale forest fires, open agricultural burning in neighbouring countries, as well as local agricultural burning had caused the haze. The disruption happened again in August 1990, from June to October 1991, and has recurred every year since 1992, plaguing the months of August, September, and October. The effects of the haze reached their zenith in 1997 when the cause of the haze was confirmed to be forest and plantation fires in Southern Sumatra, Kalimantan, and some other islands of Indonesia as the sky remained dull with pollution from August until November of that year.

== Impact ==
By September 1997, forest fires in Indonesia had been raging uncontrollably. The area where the fire took place was estimated to be the size of 4 million football pitches and was visible even from space. The Indonesian forest fires produced noxious yellow smoke clouds that smothered a vast region of South East Asia, reaching as far as northern Australia. The clouds caused the air quality disaster known as the 1997 South East Asian haze. Millions of people were forced to wear masks and hundreds of death were reported in Indonesia, as a direct or indirect result of a severe decline in air quality.

The impact of the haze caused the Air Pollution Index, which is used by Malaysia, to rises to alarmingly hazardous levels. In the Malaysian state of Sarawak, these API numbers hit record levels. In just six days, 10,000 people had sought treatment for haze related issues. In Malaysia, the Prime Minister was forced to declare a State of Emergency, closing schools, government offices and many shops all over the state, including constructions and industries, which ground to a halt. The total cost of the damage caused by the haze to Malaysia was estimated to be RM802 million or US$321 million, for the period between August and October 1997. The damage caused by the haze affected the GDP by an estimated 0.30 per cent. The haze even affected the output of gas turbines at the Kuala Langat Power Plant (KLPP), Malaysia. It was hypothesized that gas turbine combustions during haze-free periods when oxygen levels were sufficient, could to achieve perfect or near perfect combustion. However, during the period when the haze occurred, the air contained less amount of oxygen, which affected the combustion, causing it to not perform optimally.

== Actions ==
The then Malaysian Prime Minister, Mahathir Mohamad, searched desperately for a solution. The head of the Malaysian fire and rescue department came up with a plan to send a team of Malaysian firefighters across to Indonesia.

Operation Haze became the biggest cross-border firefighting mission in history. Malaysian firefighters fought a desperate battle with the fires raging across Sumatra and Kalimantan over 25 days, and faced insurmountable obstacles. At the peak of massive forest and land fires, the numbers of hotspots reached 37,938, which occurred in August 1997. Healthy-looking trees could fall upon them as it base burned out. Peat fires posed the worst risk as the firefighters could be dropped in fire pits as the fires burn deep underground.

There they encountered huge problems ranging from the lack of right equipment, no water source to fight the fires with, up to the problem of identifying the source of the fires deep in the peat land. Finally, after 25 days, they managed to battle the haze so that visibility to the sky was restored. Also, with the help of monsoon rains, the haze threat was finally over.

== Post operations ==
At the end of it all, a total of between 8 and 10 million hectares of forest was destroyed, an estimated 40,000 people sought hospital treatment and many deaths were reported, tourism was severely impacted, and an estimate of US$10 billion in losses were recorded across the region.

== Future mitigating plans ==
As part of steps taken to avoid the recurring of the Haze, the Association of Southeast Asian Nations (ASEAN) approved the need for an early warning system in the Regional Haze Action Plan (RHAP) in 1998 to prevent forest fires and the resulting haze through improved management policies and enforcements, example via Fire Danger Rating System (FDRS)

In addition, Malaysia and Indonesian come up with a Disaster Cooperation and Assistance which was signed by H.E. Datuk Seri Mohamed bin Rahmat, who is the National Disaster Management and Relief Committee Chairman as well as the Minister of Information, on behalf of the Malaysian Government and H.E. Dato’ Seri Utama ft. Azwar Anas, Coordinating Minister for People's Welfare and also chairman of the Indonesia National Disaster Management Coordinating Board (BAKORNAS-PB) on behalf of the Indonesian Government.
