= Hutan Pinus/Janthoi Nature Reserve =

Restricted nature reserve in Sumatra, Indonesia

Hutan Pinus/Janthoi
- IUCN category Ia (strict nature reserve)
- Location within Sumatra Location within Indonesia
- Location: Indonesia
- Nearest city: Kota Jantho
- Coordinates: 5.1732°N 95.6944°E
- Area: 410 square kilometres (100,000 acres; 160 sq mi)
- Established: 1984

The Hutan Pinus/Janthoi Nature Reserve is a restricted nature reserve located near the city of Kota Jantho in the north west tip of the island of Sumatra in Indonesia. It was established in 1984.
