= Singkil Barat Nature Reserve =

Nature reserve in Sumatra, Indonesia

- Area: 650 square kilometres (250 sq mi)

The Singkil Barat Nature Reserve is a 650-square-kilometre (250 sq mi) nature reserve found on the island of Sumatra, Indonesia. Located in the province of Aceh, the preserve contains the largest peat swamp within the leuser ecosystem and is hailed as the orangutan capital of the world. The Singkil is one of three peat swamps in Aceh province, the others being the smaller Kluet and much degraded Tripa. The Kluet swamp is world famous for its tool using orangutans and has been featured in documentaries. Nowhere else in the world do orangutans gather naturally in large groups or use tools.

In this park you can meet a Sumatran tiger.

== Deforestation and Conservation ==
During 2024 the Rainforest Action Network investigated land clearing in the Singkil reserve and found that supplies chains for major companies were sourcing palm oil from mills responsible for land clearing in the reserve. In 2022, 2023, and 2024 sustained clearing of forest occurred in the northern part of the reserve with canals being dug to make access into the forest easier. The Sumatran Orangutan Society has restored several hundred hectares of forest by rewetting the peat and blocking the canals. Orangutans have returned to the areas they've worked on.
