= Kallista Alam =

Company of Indonesia

PT Kallista Alam is a palm oil company from Indonesia.

In 2014, an Acehnese court found PT Kallista Alam guilty of burning around 1,000 hectares of the Tripa forest, which lies within Sumatra’s Leuser Ecosystem, the only place on Earth where tigers, elephants, rhinoceroses and orangutans can be found living together in the wild. They were fined to pay Rp 114.3 billion in compensation and Rp 251.7 billion to restore the affected areas of forest. It was given the right to use 1,605 hectares of peat swamp for a plantation in the Tripa conservation zone, one of the last refuges of the critically endangered Sumatran orangutan. When the peat swamp burnt, an estimated 100 orang-utans were killed.
