= Komodo Biosphere Reserve =

Komodo Biosphere Reserve and National Park
- Interactive map of Komodo Biosphere Reserve and National Park
- Coordinates: 8°37′30″S 119°35′27″E
- Area: 1,118,003 hectares (2,762,650 acres)
- Created: 1977
- Operator: Komodo National Park; Forum communication and consultation; Indonesian MAB Programme National Committee; Local Government of West Manggarai; PT Putri Naga Komodo; Bogor Agricultural University; University of Indonesia; Gadjah Mada University

The Komodo Biosphere Reserve and National Park is situated between Flores and Sumbawa in Indonesia. It is renowned for its population of about 5,000 giant lizards, called 'Komodo dragons' (Varanus komodoensis). They exist nowhere else in the world and are of significant interest to scientists studying the theory of evolution.

In addition to Komodo Island, the biosphere reserve encompasses the islands of Rinca and Padar, as well as numerous islets. It also includes one of the world’s richest marine environments with coral reefs.

== Ecological characteristics ==
The biosphere reserve is situated in a transition zone between Australian and Asian flora and fauna habitats. Terrestrial ecosystems include open grass land,- woodland savannah, tropical deciduous (monsoon) forest, mangroves and quasi cloud forest.

The marine area constitutes 70.2% of the biosphere reserve and is characterized by a combination of strong currents, coral reefs and islets, which make navigation around the islands in Komodo National Park difficult and dangerous. Komodo has one of the world's richest marine environments, including over 260 species of reef building coral, 70 species of sponge, ascidians, marine worms, mollusks, echinoderms, crustaceans, cartilaginous, over 1,000 species of bony fishes, marine reptiles (green turtle and hawksbill turtle), and marine mammals (dolphins, whales, and dugongs).

Notable species of high commercial value include sea cucumbers, Napoleon wrasse (Cheilinus undulatus), and groupers. The number of terrestrial animal species is important from a conservation perspective, as some species are endemic. The Komodo dragon (Varanus komodoensis) is among the world’s largest reptiles and can reach over 3.6 metres in length and weigh over 90 kg. In 1991, the Komodo National Park was declared a UNESCO World Heritage Site to protect the Komodo dragon. Many of the mammals are Asiatic in origin (e.g. deer, pig, macaques, civet), while several reptile and bird species are Australian. These include the orange-footed scrubfowl (Megapodius reinwardti), the lesser sulphur-crested cockatoo (Cacatua sulphure) and the friarbird.

== Socio-Economic Characteristics ==
The Komodo Biosphere Reserve has a total population of 97,988 inhabitants of which 3,267 live in the core area (2011 figures). Resident populations include local communities such as the Komodo, Bima and Manggarai, and migrant communities such as the Bajo and Bugis. Descendants of the original people of Komodo, the Ata Modo, still live in the reserve, but their culture and language is slowly being integrated into that of the migrant communities.

Population numbers have increased rapidly due to migration, resulting in rises in illegal logging, poaching and unsustainable fishing practices, which constitute threats to the biosphere reserve. People from local communities mostly obtain their livelihoods from farming, while the majority of migrant communities work as fishermen.

Tourism has increased significantly in recent years, a trend that this likely continue. A primary objective of the biosphere reserve is therefore to promote the sustainable use of resources through ecotourism.

== Sources ==
This article incorporates text from a free content work (license statement/permission). Text taken from UNESCO - MAB Biosphere Reserves Directory, UNESCO, UNESCO.
