= Deforestation in Indonesia =

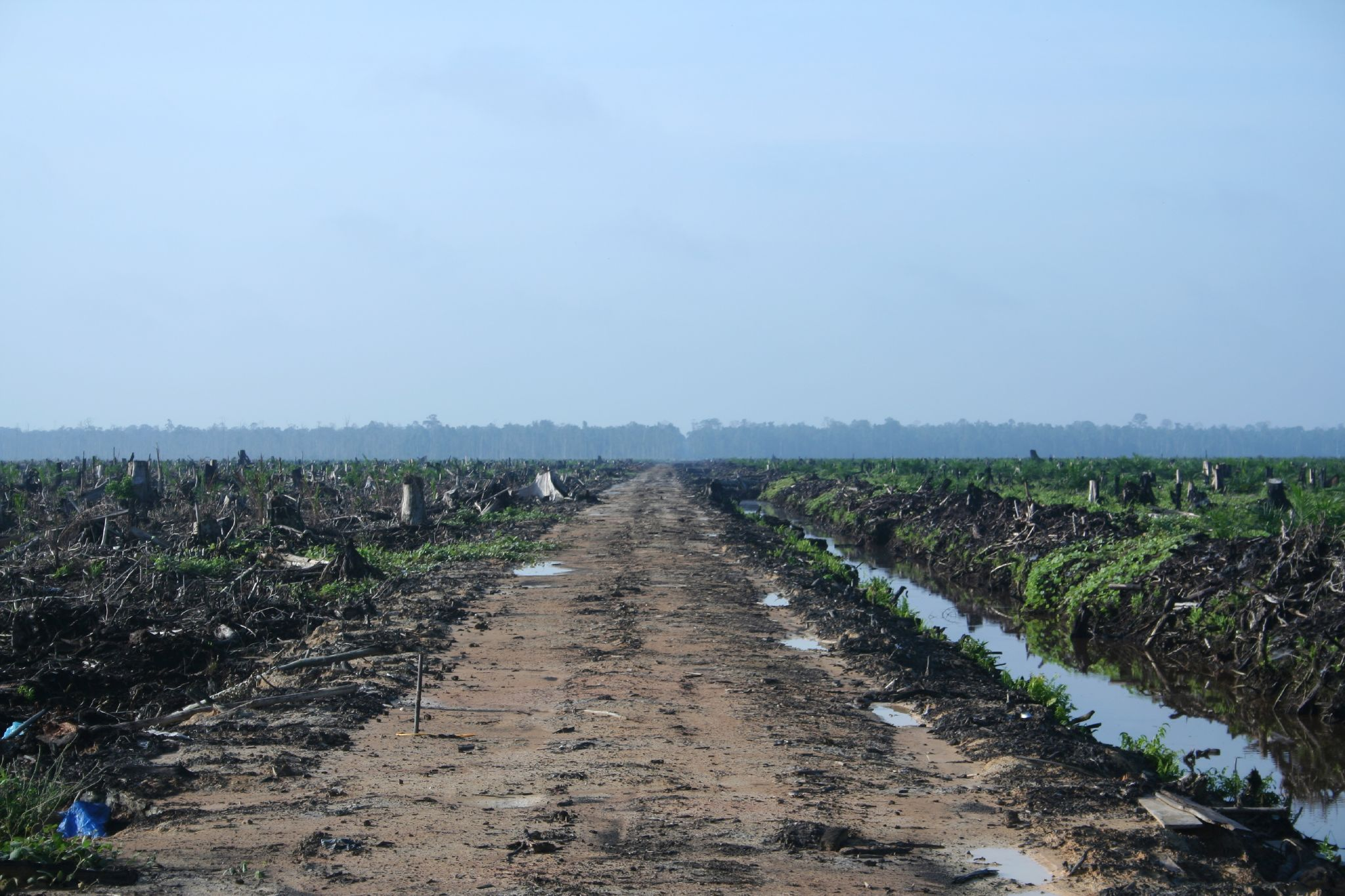
Deforestation in Riau province, Sumatra, to make way for an oil palm plantation (2007).

Deforestation in Indonesia involves the long-term loss of forests and foliage across much of the country; it has had massive environmental and social impacts. Indonesia is home to some of the most biologically diverse forests in the world and ranks third in number of species behind Brazil and the Democratic Republic of Congo.

As late as 1900, Indonesia was still a densely forested country: forests represented 84 percent of the total land area. Deforestation intensified in the 1970s and has accelerated further since then. The estimated forest cover of 170 million hectares around 1900 decreased to less than 100 million hectares by the end of the 20th century. In 2008, it was estimated that tropical rainforests in Indonesia would be logged out in a decade. Of the total logging in Indonesia, up to 80% is reported to be performed illegally.

Large areas of forest in Indonesia have been cleared by large multinational pulp companies, such as Asia Pulp and Paper, and replaced by plantations. Forests are often burned by farmers and plantation owners. Another major source of deforestation is the logging industry, driven by demand from China and Japan. Agricultural development and transmigration programs moved large populations into rainforest areas, further increasing deforestation rates. The widespread deforestation (and other environmental destruction) in Indonesia is often described by academics as an ecocide.

Logging and the burning of forests to clear land for cultivation have historically made Indonesia one of the world's largest emitters of greenhouse gases, behind China and the United States. Forest fires often destroy major carbon sinks, including old-growth rainforest and peat swamp forests. In May 2011, Indonesia declared a moratorium on new logging contracts to help address deforestation. The policy initially had limited impact, and by 2012 Indonesia had surpassed Brazil’s deforestation rate, becoming the world’s fastest forest-clearing nation.

In recent years, however, deforestation rates have declined. According to 2025 data from the University of Maryland’s Global Land Analysis and Discovery (GLAD) Lab, Indonesia reduced primary forest loss by 11% from 2023 to 2024, reversing a steady increase seen between 2021 and 2023. Fires remained relatively mild, and total loss stayed well below the peaks recorded in the mid-2010s. The final year of President Joko Widodo’s administration saw continued emphasis on forest protection, restoration, and fire prevention, supported by government programs, local community initiatives, and private-sector efforts to reduce deforestation linked to commodities such as palm oil and timber. Most primary forest loss occurred near existing plantations, small-scale farms, and mining areas; with localized increases reported in several provinces, including Aceh, Bengkulu, and South Sumatra on Sumatra, as well as in Papua. Losses were also observed within protected areas such as Kerinci Seblat, Tesso Nilo, and the Leuser ecosystem.

In 2025, forest loss in Indonesia surged by 66%, reaching its highest rate in eight years.

== History ==
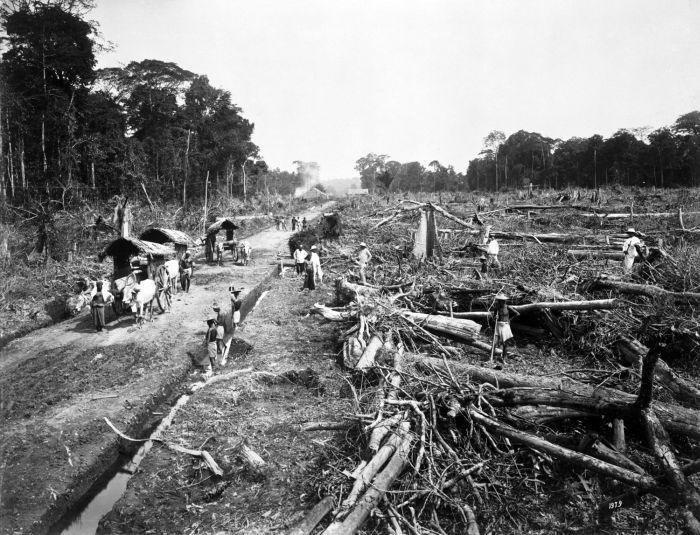
Deforestation for a tobacco plantation in North Sumatra (ca.1900).

The Indonesian archipelago of about 17,000 islands is home to some of the most biodiverse forests in the world. In 1900 the total forest represented 84% of the total land area. By 1950 plantations and smallholder plantings of tree crops still only covered a small area. The forest cover by that time is estimated to 145 million ha (hectares) of primary forest and another 14 million ha (hectares) of secondary and tidal forest.

In the early 1970s Indonesia used this valuable resource to its economic benefit with the development of the country's wood processing industries. From the late 1980s to 2000, production capacity has increased nearly 700% in the pulp and paper industries, making Indonesia the world's ninth largest pulp producer and eleventh largest paper producer.

The rate of deforestation continues to increase. The 2009 State Environment Report launched by President Susilo Bambang Yudhoyono revealed that the number of fire hotspots rose to 32,416 in 2009 from only 19,192 in 2008. The Environment Ministry blamed the increase on weak law enforcement and a lack of supervision from local authorities, with land clearance as the primary cause of the fires.

Between 1990 and 2000 20% of the forest area in Indonesia had been lost (24 million ha) and by 2010, only 52% of the total land area was forested (94 million ha). Even despite a moratorium on new logging contracts imposed in 2010, the rate of deforestation continued to increase to an estimated 840,000 hectares in 2012, surpassing deforestation in Brazil. Deforestation in Indonesia peaked in 2016, and thereafter declined, falling by about 30% (comparing 2009–2016 with 2017–2019). Studies attributed the decline to "a policy mix including bans on primary forest clearing and peat drainage, a review of land concessions, and a moratorium on new palm oil plantations and mines" as well as to oil palm sustainability certification programs for forests on existing plantations. Community forest titles were also issued for 2.4 million hectares across Indonesia, but a 2021 study did not find evidence that these programs reduced deforestation.

== Drivers of deforestation ==
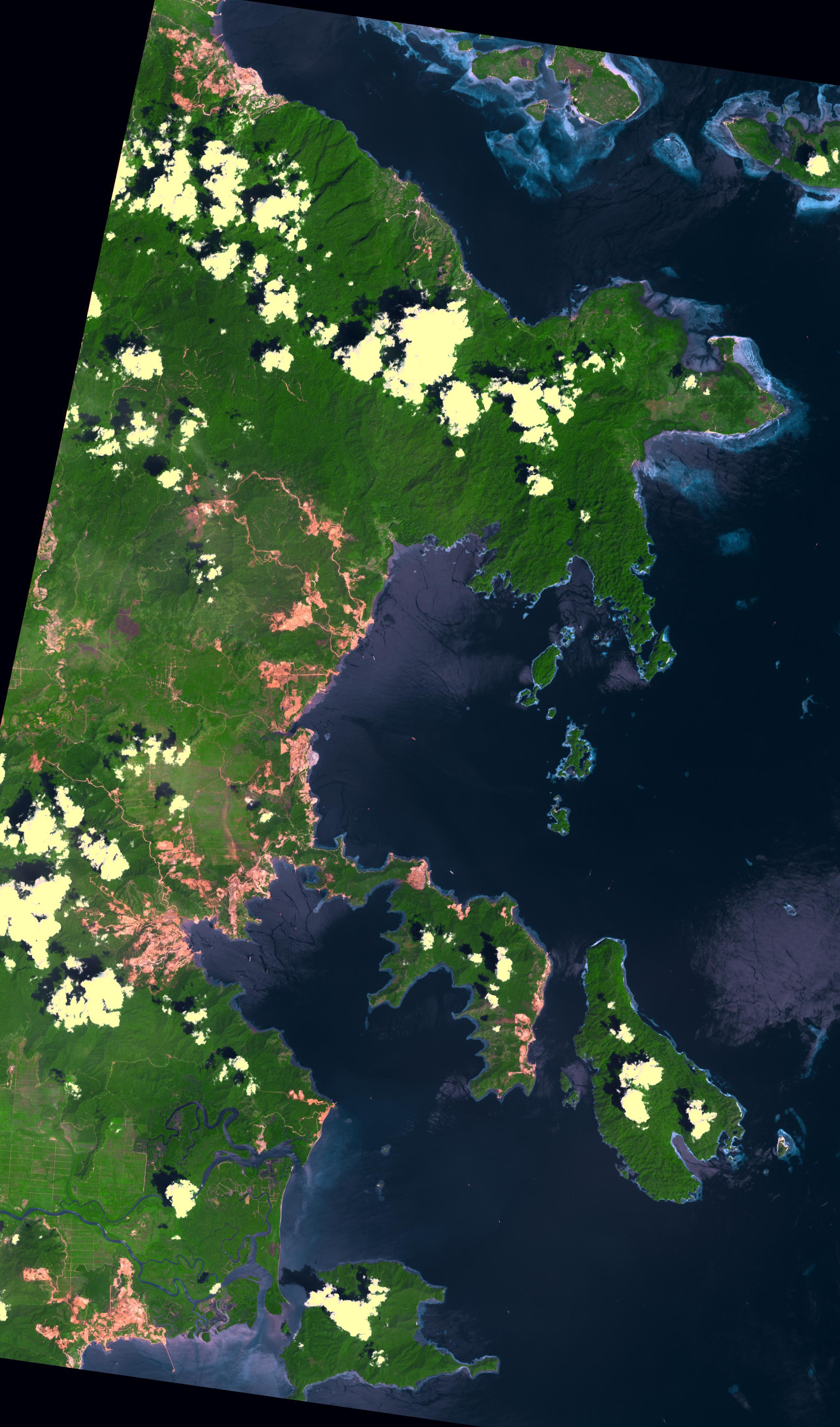
About 50 nickel mining companies operate in southeast Sulawesi. In order to mine nickel, large areas of trees are cut down to create open pits.

Over the years 2001–2022, the largest single driver of deforestation in Indonesia was palm oil plantations, accounting for about 70% of deforestation nationwide. Clearances for small-scale agriculture and small-scale mixed plantations accounted for a combined 22% of deforestation nationwide. Logging roads and small-scale clearings, followed by regrowth of secondary forest, accounted for about 10% of deforestation nationwide. All other causes (such as mining and fish ponds) collectively accounted for about 5% of deforestation nationwide.

In Indonesia, at least 3.3 million hectares of forest were turned into palm oil plantation. However, annual primary forest loss declined from 930,000 hectares in 2016 to 230,000 hectares in 2022. According to the new rules established by the government, landowners that grow oil palm plantation on production forest land will pay fines, while those who grow them on protected forest land will give them to government for being converted to forests again. 200,000 hectares of plantation will be converted to forest. Legal action will be taken against companies who grow the plantations illegally.

In 2024, nickel mining and processing was one of the main causes of deforestation in Indonesia.

== Effects ==
Rapid and increasing deforestation harms Indonesia's broad biodiversity and drives Indonesia's greenhouse gas emissions, which are among the world's highest. The conversion and burning of peat soils causes severe air pollution, presenting major public health harms.

== Affected regions ==
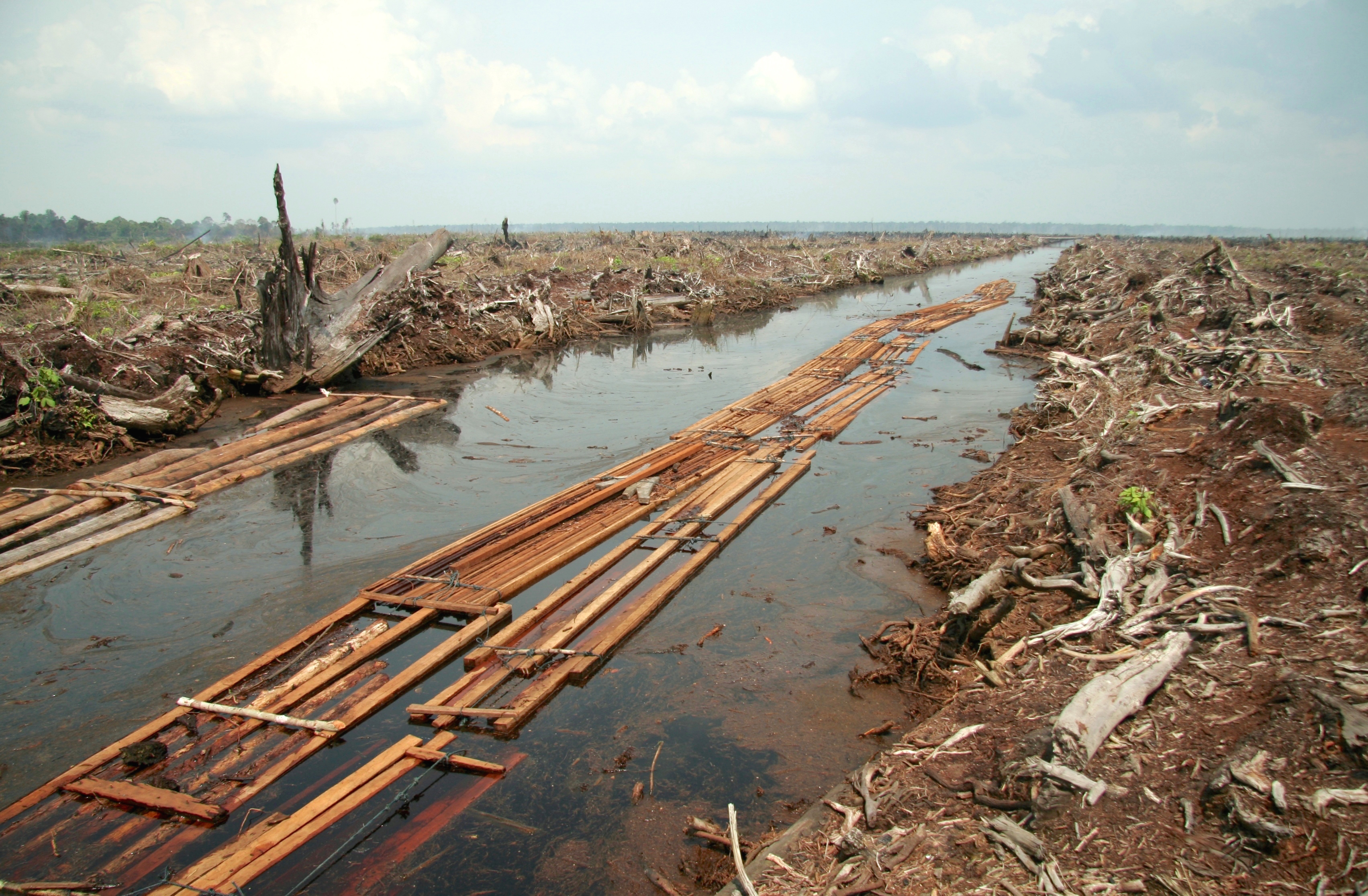
The deforestation of a peat swamp forest for palm oil production in Indonesia.

Indonesia's lowland tropical forests, the richest in timber resources and biodiversity, are most at risk. By 2000 they have been almost entirely cleared in Sulawesi, and predicted to disappear within few years in Sumatra and Kalimantan.

In Sumatra tens of thousands of square kilometres of forest have been destroyed often under central government concessions given to palm oil companies to remove the forest. In Kalimantan, from 1991 to 2014, large areas of the forest were burned because of uncontrollable fire causing atmospheric pollution across South-East Asia.

The construction of the Trans-Papua Highway is expected to open up large areas of rainforest in Western New Guinea to logging.

== Illegal land clearing ==
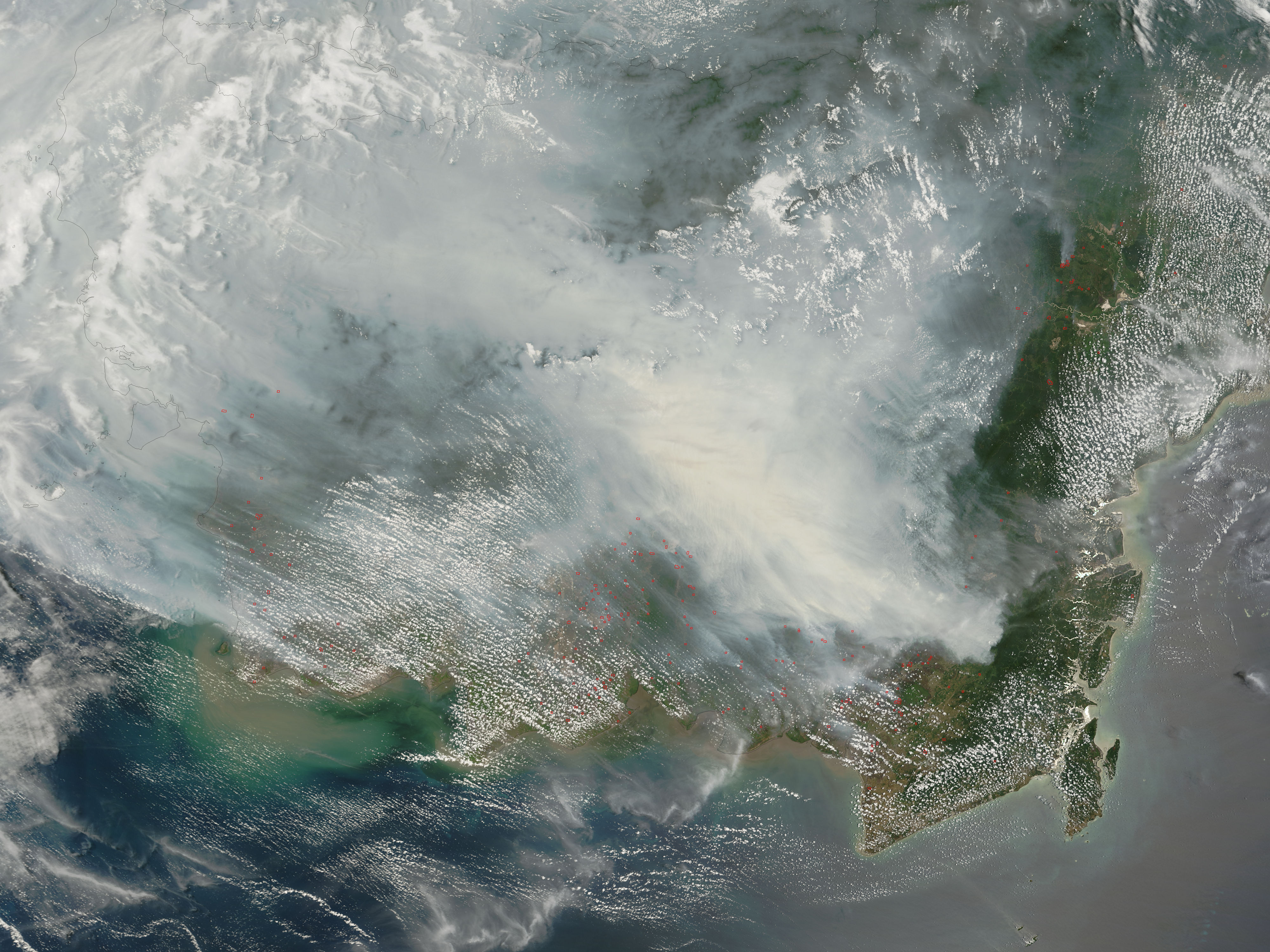
NASA's Terra satellite picture of thick smoke hung over the island of Borneo on 5 October 2006. The fires occur annually in the dry season (August–October), caused mainly by land-clearing and other agricultural fires, but fires escape control and burn into forests and peat-swamp areas.

A 2007 United Nations Environment Program report estimated that between 73% and 88% of timber logged in Indonesia is the result of illegal logging. Subsequent estimates were that between 40% and 55% of logged in Indonesia is the result of illegal logging. A 2021 study estimated that 81% of forest conversion for palm oil in Indonesia was illegal, and that Indonesia's Supreme Audit Agency determined that less than 20% of the nation's palm oil operations complied with national laws and regulations.

Malaysia is the key transit country for illegal wood products from Indonesia.

Private corporations, motivated by economic profits from local and regional market demands for timber, are culpable for deforestation. These agro-industrial companies often do not comply with the basic legal regulations by inappropriately employing cost effective yet environmentally inefficient deforestation methods such as forest fires to clear the land for agricultural purposes. The 1999 Forestry Law states that it is essential for companies to be endorsed by authorities in respective regions with an IPK permit, a timber harvesting permit, for legal approval of their deforestation activities. Many of these corporations could circumvent this red tape, maximise revenue profits by employing illegal logging activities as lax law enforcement and porous law regulations in large developing countries like Indonesia undermine forestry conservation efforts.

In the social landscape, small-scale subsistence farmers in rural areas, who received minimal education, employ a basic method of slash-and-burn to support their agricultural activities. This rudimentary agricultural technique involves the felling of forest trees before a dry season and, subsequently, the burning of these trees in the following dry season to provide fertilisers to support their crop activities. This agricultural practice is repetitively employed on the same plot of land until it is denuded of its nutrients and could no longer suffice to support agricultural yields. Thereafter, these farmers will move on to occupy another plot of land and continually practice their slash-and-burn technique. This contributing social factor to deforestation reinforces the challenges faced by forestry sustainability in developing countries such as Indonesia.

On the political front, the Indonesian governmental role in curbing deforestation has largely been criticised. Corruption amongst local Indonesian officials fuels cynicism with regard to the governmental clampdown on illegal logging activities. In 2008, the acquittal of a proprietor for a timber firm, Adelin Lis, alleged for illegal logging further galvanised public opinion and drew criticisms at the Indonesian political institution.

The Indonesian government grapples with the management of deforestation with sustainable urban development as rural-urban migration necessitates the expansion of cities. The lack of accountability to deforestation with pertinence to transmigration projects undertaken by the Indonesian government illustrates minimal supporting evidence to testify to considerations for forestry sustainability in their development projects. This further augments scepticism in the Indonesian government's credibility in efficiently and responsibly managing their urban development projects and forestry conservation efforts.

== Tree cover extent and loss ==
Global Forest Watch publishes annual estimates of tree cover loss and 2000 tree cover extent derived from time-series analysis of Landsat satellite imagery in the Global Forest Change dataset. In this framework, tree cover refers to vegetation taller than 5 m (including natural forests and tree plantations), and tree cover loss is defined as the complete removal of tree cover canopy for a given year, regardless of cause.

For Indonesia, the dashboard reports that from 2001 to 2024 the country lost about 32,000,000 ha (320,000 km^{2}) of tree cover (about 20% of its 2000 tree cover area). For tree cover density greater than 30%, country statistics report a 2000 tree cover extent of 160,640,822 ha (1,606,408.22 km^{2}). The charts and table below display this data. In simple terms, the annual loss number is the area where tree cover disappeared in that year, and the extent number shows what remains of the 2000 tree cover baseline after subtracting cumulative loss. Forest regrowth is not included in the dataset.

Annual tree cover loss in Indonesia, 2001–2024. View chart definition.
Tree cover extent in 2000 minus cumulative tree cover loss in Indonesia, 2001–2024 (loss-only residual; does not account for gain). View chart definition.

Annual tree cover extent and loss
Year	Tree cover extent (km2) (Note: This residual measure does not include forest regrowth.)	Annual tree cover loss (km2)
2001	1,598,967.38	7,440.84
2002	1,590,414.68	8,552.70
2003	1,584,966.57	5,448.11
2004	1,572,076.22	12,890.35
2005	1,560,251.86	11,824.36
2006	1,545,920.39	14,331.47
2007	1,532,044.19	13,876.20
2008	1,518,081.72	13,962.47
2009	1,498,632.14	19,449.58
2010	1,485,838.86	12,793.28
2011	1,470,402.59	15,436.27
2012	1,447,800.01	22,602.58
2013	1,436,407.01	11,393.00
2014	1,417,463.42	18,943.59
2015	1,399,998.78	17,464.64
2016	1,375,778.13	24,220.65
2017	1,362,770.94	13,007.19
2018	1,350,583.61	12,187.33
2019	1,338,814.77	11,768.84
2020	1,329,198.92	9,615.85
2021	1,320,785.02	8,413.90
2022	1,311,932.65	8,852.37
2023	1,297,979.80	13,952.85
2024	1,286,777.16	11,202.64

== Conservation efforts ==
Efforts to curb global climate change have included measures designed to monitor the progression of deforestation in Indonesia and incentivise national and local governments to halt it. The general term for these sorts of programs is Reducing emissions from deforestation and forest degradation (REDD). New systems to monitor deforestation are being applied to Indonesia. One such system, the Center for Global Development's Forest Monitoring for Action platform currently displays monthly-updated data on deforestation throughout Indonesia.

On 26 May 2010 Indonesia signed a letter of intent with Norway, to place a two-year moratorium on new logging concessions, part of a deal in which Indonesia will receive up to $US1 billion if it adheres to its commitment. The accord was expected to put curbs on Indonesia's palm oil industry and delay or slow plans for the creation of a huge agricultural estate in Papua province. Funds will initially be devoted to finalising Indonesia's climate and forest strategy, building and institutionalising capacity to monitor, report and verify reduced emissions, and putting in place enabling policies and institutional reforms. Norway is going to help Indonesia to set up a system to help reduce corruption so that the deal can be enforced. The two-year logging moratorium was declared on 20 May 2011. The moratorium was extended by another two years in 2013.

In 2014, Indonesia was one of about 40 countries who endorsed the New York Declaration on Forests, a voluntary pledge to halve deforestation by 2020 and end it by 2030. The agreement was not legally binding, however, and some key countries, such as Brazil, China, and Russia, did not sign onto it. As a result, the effort failed, and deforestation increased from 2014 to 2020, both globally and in Indonesia. In November 2021, Indonesia was one of 141 countries (collectively making up around 85% of the world's primary tropical forests and 90% of global tree cover) agreed at the COP26 climate summit in Glasgow to the Glasgow Leaders' Declaration on Forests and Land Use, a pledge to end and reverse deforestation by 2030. The agreement was accompanied by about $19.2 billion in associated funding commitments. Like the earlier agreement, the Glasgow Leaders' Declaration was entered into outside the UN Framework Convention on Climate Change and is thus not legally binding. Immediately after Indonesia entered the pledge, the county's government walked back the commitment, with environment minister Siti Nurbaya Bakar stating that "forcing Indonesia to zero deforestation in 2030 is clearly inappropriate and unfair".

=== Forest Reference Emission Levels ===
Indonesia has submitted national forest reference emission levels (FRELs) and forest reference levels (FRLs) under the UNFCCC REDD+ framework. These benchmarks are used in the context of results-based payments, and each submission is subject to a UNFCCC technical assessment.

Indonesia’s first national FREL (submitted in January 2016) covered gross CO_{2} emissions from deforestation and forest degradation in land that was natural forest in 1990 (about 113.2 million hectares). It used a 1990–2012 historical reference period and included emissions from above-ground biomass and (on peatlands) soil organic carbon, while excluding other pools, non-CO_{2} gases, and other REDD+ activities. The assessed FREL corresponded to 568,859,881 t CO2 eq for 2013, increasing to 593,329,235 t CO2 eq for 2020 because peat decomposition emissions were treated as accumulating over time.

In 2022 Indonesia submitted an updated national FRL for the 2006–2020 reference period that expanded the scope to include removals from enhancement of forest carbon stocks and reported an annual average of net emissions/removals. The technical assessment reported an assessed FRL of 192,921,295 t CO2 eq per year (revised from 267,705,902 t CO2 eq per year in the original submission). The technical assessment noted that differences between the 2016 and 2022 benchmarks mainly reflect changes in scope and methods (including added pools and non-CO_{2} gases, refined activity data and emission factors, a different reference period, and the exclusion of inherited peat decomposition emissions from drainage prior to the monitoring period), so the headline totals are not directly comparable as a simple indicator of deforestation trends.

== See also ==
- Deforestation in Borneo
- Deforestation in Malaysia
- Deforestation in Papua New Guinea
- 1997 Indonesian forest fires
- Palm oil production in Indonesia
- Pig Feast (2026 film)
- The Burning Season (2008 film)
- APP
- Forest Management

General:

- Environmental issues in Indonesia
- Crime in Indonesia
