= 1997 Indonesian forest fires =

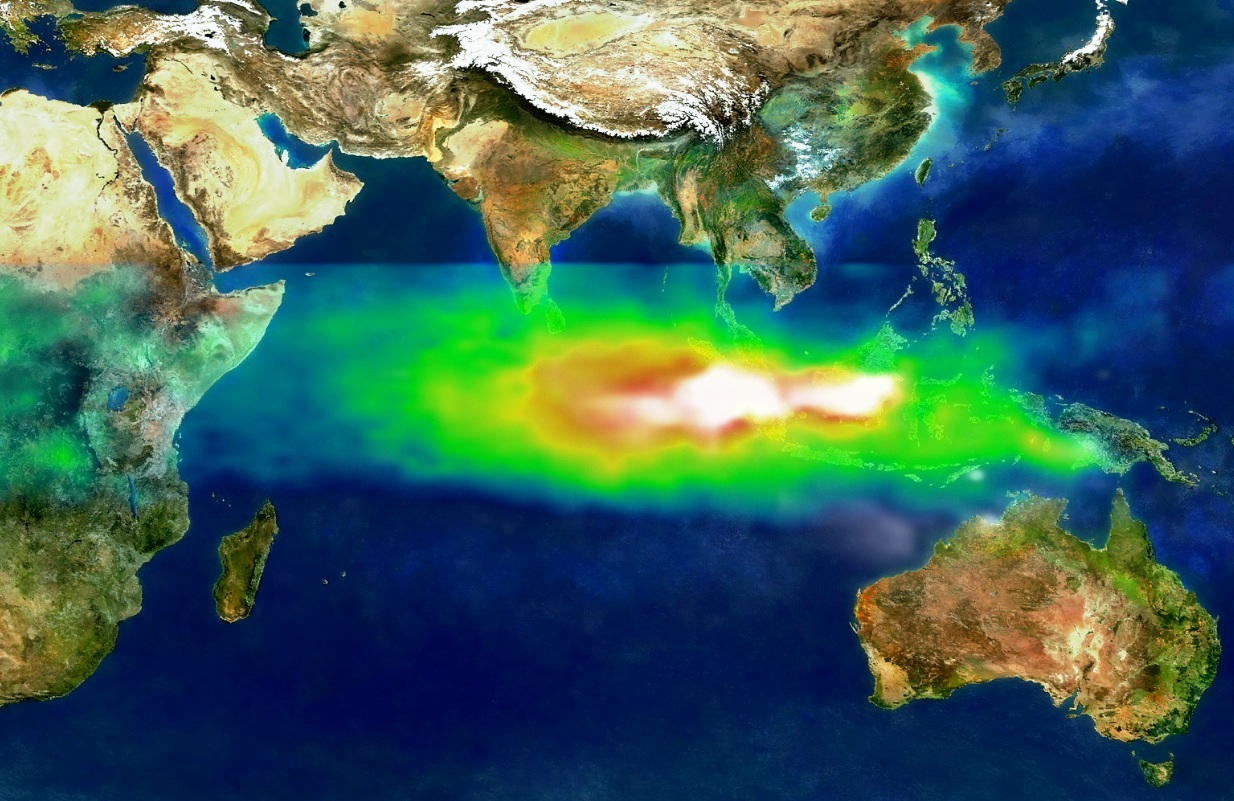
Air pollution over Southeast Asia in October 1997

The 1997 group of forest fires in Indonesia that lasted well into 1998 were probably among the two or three, if not the largest, forest fires group in the last two centuries of recorded history.

In the middle of 1997 forest fires burning in Indonesia began to affect neighbouring countries, spreading thick clouds of smoke and haze to Malaysia and Singapore. Then Malaysian Prime Minister Mahathir Mohamad searched desperately for a solution, and based on a plan by the head of the Malaysian fire and rescue department sent a team of Malaysian firefighters across to Indonesia under code name Operation Haze. This is to mitigate the effect of the Haze to Malaysia economy. The value of the Haze damage to Malaysian GDP is estimated to be 0.30 per cent.

Seasonal rains in early December brought a brief respite but soon after the dry conditions and fires returned. By late 1997 and early 1998 Brunei, Thailand, Vietnam, the Philippines and Sri Lanka had also felt the haze from the smoke of the forest fires. By the time the 1997–98 forest fires were finally over some 8 million hectares of land had burned while countless millions of people suffered from air pollution.

== Causes and effect ==
The 1997 Indonesian forest fires were caused by changing land use which made the tropical forest vulnerable to fire during a drought associated with that year's El Niño. Indonesian forests have historically been resistant to burning even during long dry seasons and despite the use of fire to clear land for swidden agriculture. The land use changes that led to the fires were a combination of industrial-scale logging, draining peatlands for conversion to oil palm and fast-growing tree plantations, and a massive government program to drain swamps and convert them to rice paddies. A total of 240 people perished in the wildfires.

Due to the heavy smoke caused by the fires, an Airbus A300 operating as Garuda Indonesia Flight 152 crashed on approach to Medan's Polonia Airport. All 234 people on board died, making it the worst crash in Indonesian history.

== Estimated cost ==
The total economic value of the damages is conservatively estimated to be US$4.47 billion, of which by far the largest share was borne by Indonesia. This figure excludes a number of damages that are especially difficult to measure or to value in monetary terms, such as loss of human life, long-term health impacts, and some biodiversity losses.

Forest fires in Indonesia in 1997 were estimated to have released between 0.81 and 2.57 gigatonnes of carbon into the atmosphere, which is between 13 and 40% of the annual carbon dioxide emissions from burning fossil fuels.

As part of steps taken to avoid the recurring of the Haze, the Association of Southeast Asian Nations (ASEAN) approved the need for an early warning system in the Regional Haze Action Plan (RHAP) in 1998 to prevent forest fires and the resulting haze through improved management policies and enforcements, example via Fire Danger Rating System (FDRS).

== Countries affected ==
- Indonesia
- Singapore
- Malaysia
- Thailand
- Brunei
- Vietnam
- Philippines
- Sri Lanka

== See also ==
- Air quality index
- Pollutant Standards Index
- Haze
- 2005 Malaysian haze
- 2006 Southeast Asian haze
- Slash and burn
- Asian brown cloud
- 1997 Southeast Asian haze
- 2015 Southeast Asian haze
- 2026 Indonesia wildfires
- 2026 Southeast Asian haze

General:

- List of disasters in Indonesia
