= Wildfires in 2019 =

Wildfire season in 2019

2019 wildfire season
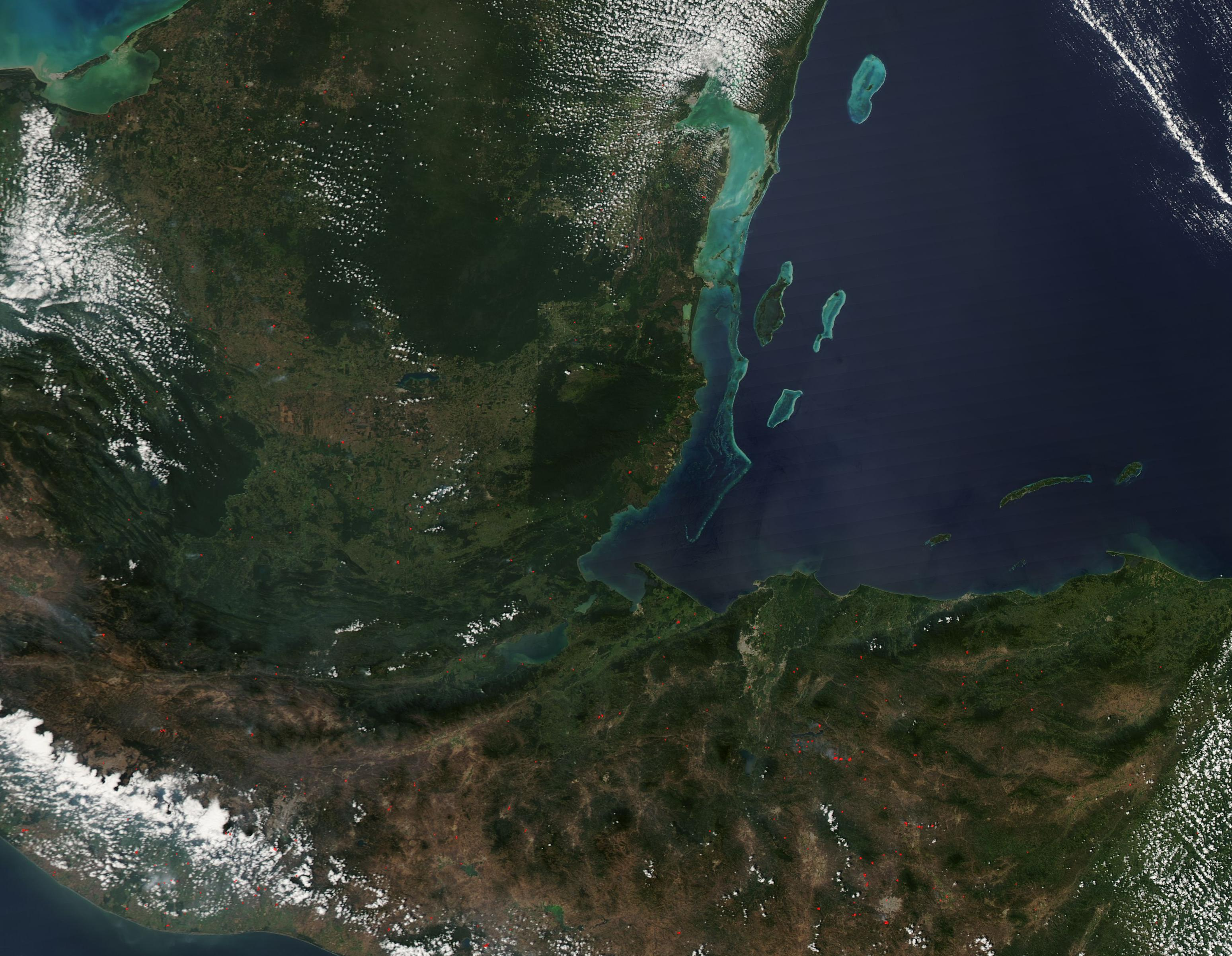
- True-color image of fire and smoke over part of Central America acquired on February 19
- Date: January–December 2019

The 2019 wildfire season involved wildfires on multiple continents.

Below is a partial list of articles on wildfires from around the world in the year 2019.

== Africa ==
- 2019 Canary Islands wildfires, Spain

== Asia ==
- 2019 Bandipur forest fires, India
- Goseong Fire of 2019, South Korea
- 2019 Siberia wildfires, Russia
- 2019 Vietnam forest fires
- 2019 Southeast Asian haze

== Europe ==
- 2019 United Kingdom wildfires

== North America ==
- Deshka Landing Fire, United States
- 2019 Alberta wildfires, Canada
- 2019 California wildfires, United States
- 2019 Washington wildfires, United States

== Oceania ==
- 2018–19 Australian bushfire season
- 2019 Nelson fires, New Zealand
- 2019–20 Australian bushfire season

== South America ==
- 2019 Amazon wildfires
