= 2019 Amazon rainforest wildfires =

Wildfires in Brazil

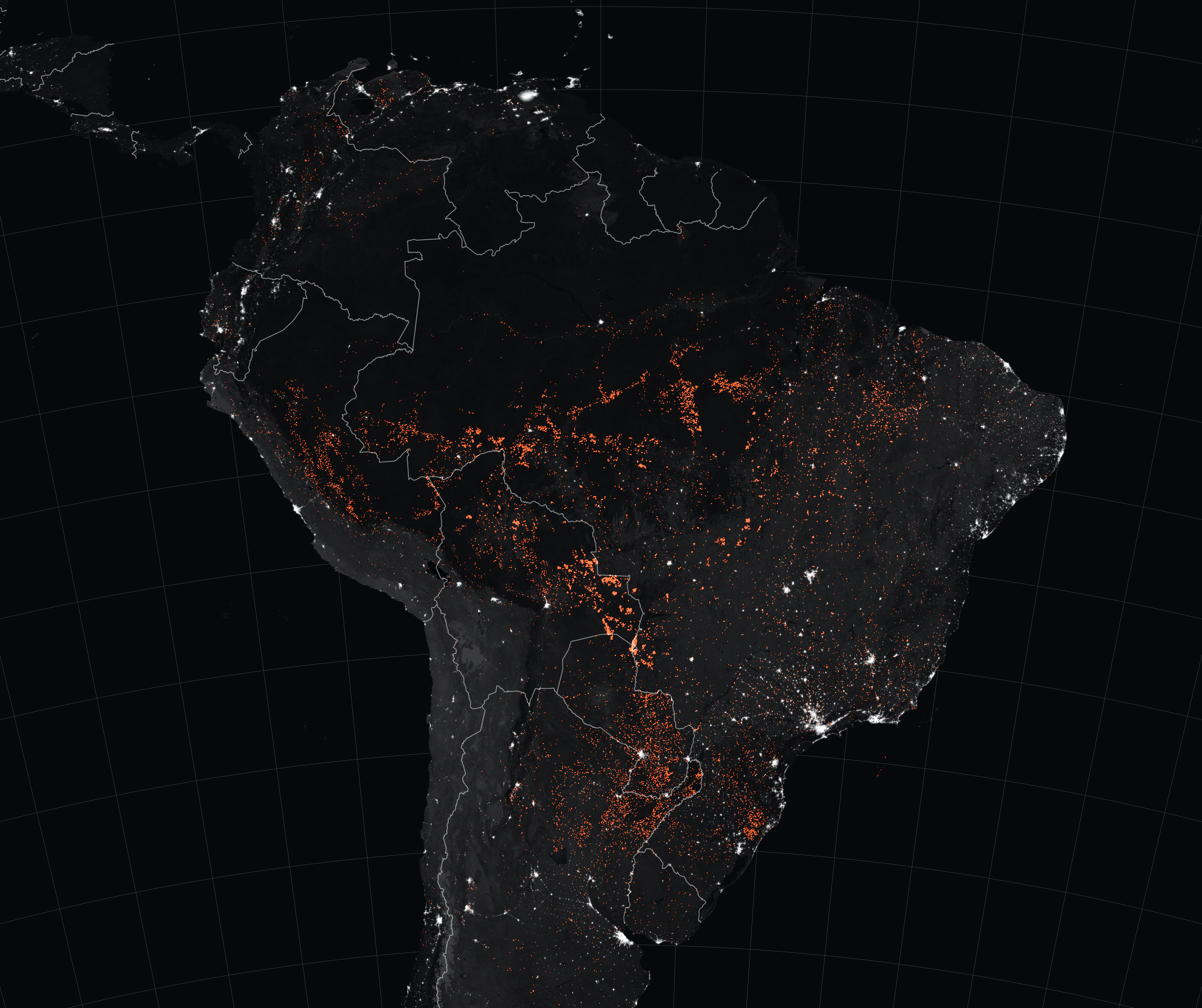
- Locations of fires, marked in orange, which were detected by MODIS from August 15 to 22, 2019
- Date: January–October 2019
- Location: Brazil, Bolivia, Peru, Paraguay, Colombia

Statistics
- Total fires: 631289
- Burned area: 906,000 hectares (2,240,000 acres; 9,060 km^{2}; 3,500 sq mi)
- Land use: Agricultural development

Impacts
- Deaths: 2
- Cost: >$900 billion (2019 USD)

Ignition
- Cause: Slash-and-burn approach to deforest land for agriculture and effects of climate change and global warming due to unusually longer dry season and above average temperatures worldwide throughout 2019

Map
- Amazon rainforest ecoregions as delineated by the WWF in white and the Amazon drainage basin in blue.

The 2019 Amazon rainforest wildfires season saw a year-to-year surge in fires occurring in the Amazon rainforest and Amazon biome within Brazil, Bolivia, Paraguay, and Peru during that year's Amazonian tropical dry season. Fires normally occur around the dry season as slash-and-burn methods are used to clear the forest to make way for agriculture, livestock, logging, and mining, leading to deforestation of the Amazon rainforest. Such activity is generally illegal within these nations, but enforcement of environmental protection can be lax. The increased rates of fire counts in 2019 led to international concern about the fate of the Amazon rainforest, which is the world's largest terrestrial carbon dioxide sink and plays a significant role in mitigating global warming.

The increasing rates were first reported by Brazil's National Institute for Space Research (Instituto Nacional de Pesquisas Espaciais, INPE) in June and July 2019 through satellite monitoring systems, but international attention was drawn to the situation by August 2019 when NASA corroborated INPE's findings, and smoke from the fires, visible from satellite imagery, darkened the city of São Paulo despite being thousands of kilometers from the Amazon. As of August 29, 2019, INPE reported more than 80,000 fires across all of Brazil, a 77% year-to-year increase for the same tracking period, with more than 40,000 in the Brazil's Legal Amazon (Amazônia Legal or BLA), which contains 60% of the Amazon. Similar year-to-year increases in fires were subsequently reported in Bolivia, Paraguay and Peru, with the 2019 fire counts within each nation of over 19,000, 11,000 and 6,700, respectively, as of August 29, 2019. It is estimated that over 906 thousand hectares (2.24×10^{6} acres; 9,060 km^{2}; 3,500 mi^{2}) of forest within the Amazon biome has been lost to fires in 2019. In addition to the impact on global climate, the fires created environmental concerns from the excess carbon dioxide (CO_{2}) and carbon monoxide (CO) within the fires' emissions, potential impacts on the biodiversity of the Amazon, and threats to indigenous tribes that live within the forest. Ecologists estimated that the dieback from the Amazon rainforest due to the fires could cost Brazil US$957 billion to US$3.5 trillion over a 30-year period.

The increased rate of fires in Brazil has raised the most concerns as international leaders, particularly French president Emmanuel Macron, and environmental non-government organizations (ENGOs) attributed these to Brazilian president Jair Bolsonaro's pro-business policies that had weakened environmental protections and have encouraged deforestation of the Amazon after he took office in January 2019. Bolsonaro initially remained ambivalent and rejected international calls to take action, asserting that the criticism was sensationalist. Following increased pressure at the 45th G7 summit and a threat to reject the pending European Union–Mercosur free trade agreement, Bolsonaro dispatched over 44,000 Brazilian troops and allocated funds to fight the fires, and later signed a decree to prevent such fires for a sixty-day period.

Other Amazonian countries have been affected by the wildfires in higher or lesser degree. The number of hectares of Bolivian rainforest affected by the wildfires were roughly equal to those of Brazil, being the area of Bolivia only about one-eighth of Brazil's. Bolivian president Evo Morales was similarly blamed for past policies that encouraged deforestation, Morales has also taken proactive measures to fight the fires and seek aid from other countries. At the G7 summit, Macron negotiated with the other nations to allocate US$22 million for emergency aid to the Amazonian countries affected by the fires.

== Amazon forest and deforestation ==
There are 671 million acres of Amazon rainforest. Human-driven deforestation of the Amazon rainforest has been a major concern for decades as the rainforest's impact on the global climate has been measured. From a global climate perspective, the Amazon has been the world's largest carbon dioxide sink, and estimated to capture up to 25% of global carbon dioxide generation into plants and other biomass. Without this sink, atmospheric carbon dioxide concentrations would increase and contribute towards higher global temperatures, thus making the viability of the Amazon a global concern. Further, when the forest is lost through fire, additional carbon dioxide is released to the atmosphere, and could potentially contribute significantly to the total carbon dioxide content. The flora also generates significant quantities of water vapor through transpiration which travel large distances to other parts of South America via atmospheric rivers and contribute to the precipitation in these areas. Due to ongoing global climate change, environmental scientists have raised concerns that the Amazon could reach a "tipping point" where it would irreversibly die out, the land becoming more savanna than forest, under certain climate change conditions which are exacerbated by anthropogenic activities.

Human-driven deforestation of the Amazon is used to clear land for agriculture, livestock, and mining, and for its lumber. Most forest is typically cleared using slash-and-burn processes; huge amounts of biomass are removed by first pulling down the trees in the Amazon using bulldozers and giant tractors during the wet season (November through June), followed by torching the tree trunks several months later in the dry season (July through October). Fires are most common in July through August. In some cases, workers performing the burn are unskilled, and may inadvertently allow these fires to spread. While most countries in the Amazon do have laws and environmental enforcement against deforestation, these are not well enforced, and much of the slash-and-burn activity is done illegally.

Deforestation leads to a large number of observed fires across the Amazon during the dry season, usually tracked by satellite data. While it is possible for naturally occurring wildfires to occur in the Amazon, the chances are far less likely to occur, compared to those in California or in Australia. Even with global warming, spontaneous fires in the Amazon cannot come from warm weather alone, but warm weather is capable of exacerbating the fires once started as there will be drier biomass available for the fire to spread. Alberto Setzer of INPE estimated that 99% of the wildfires in the Amazon basin are a result of human actions, either on purpose or accidentally. Man-made fires in the Amazon also tend to elevate their smoke into the higher atmosphere due to the more intense burn of the dry biomass, compared with naturally occurring wildfires. Further evidence of the fires being caused by human activity is due to their clustering near roads and existing agricultural areas rather than remote parts of the forest.

On November 18, 2019, Brazilian authorities announced the official deforestation figures, based on the PRODES satellite monitoring system for the 2019 forest year—from August 1, 2018, to July 31, 2019. The rate of deforestation was the "worst in more than a decade" with 970,000 hectares (2,400,000 acres) lost.

In August 2020 Brazil's National Institute for Space Research reported that satellite data shows that the number of fires in the Amazon increased by 28% to ~6,800 fires in July compared to the ~5,300 wildfires in July 2019. This indicated a, potentially worsened, repeat of 2019's accelerated destruction of one of the world's largest protectable buffers against global warming in 2020.

== Broad types of fire in the Amazon ==
Amazon fires can be separated into three broad categories. First, deforestation-related fires are those used to prepare the area for agriculture after a primary forest being felled and the vegetation left to dry. Second, there are those agricultural burns, when fires are used to clear existing pastureland and/or by smallholders and traditional people in rotational agriculture. Finally, the previous fire types can escape beyond intended limits and invade standing forests. When a forest burns for the first time, fire intensity is usually low and flames are mostly restricted to the understory while repeated fire events have higher intensity. Forest fires are a threat to the Amazonian biodiversity and jeopardize the ability of forest trees to mitigate climate change by storing carbon. When studying Amazonian fires, it is important to consider the marked spatial differences in precipitation patterns across the Amazon Basin, which does not have a single dry season.

== Fires in Brazil ==
=== Past deforestation and fires in Brazil ===
Location of Amazônia Legal (red) within Brazil

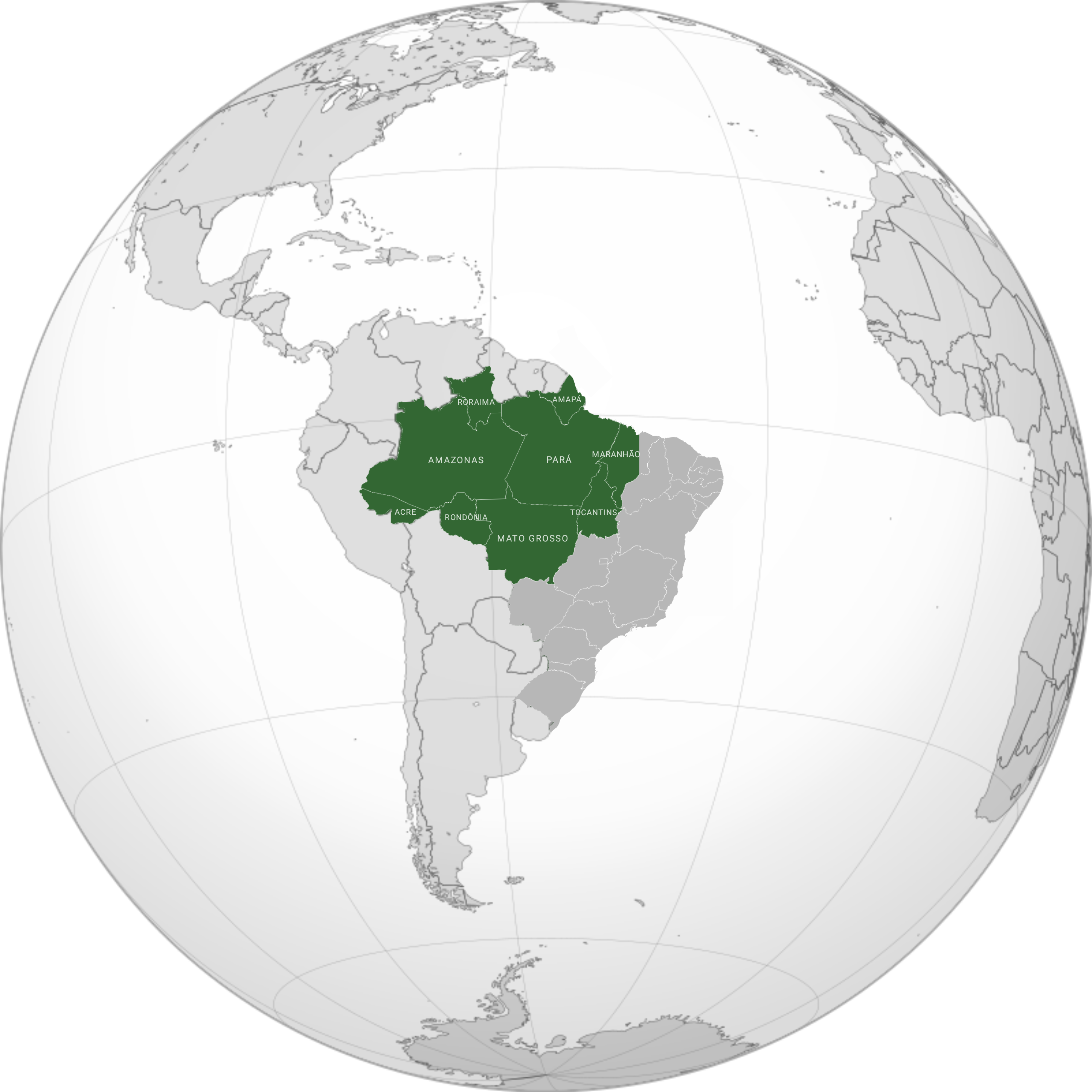
States within Amazônia Legal.

Brazil's role in deforestation of the Amazon rainforest has been a significant issue during the 1930s, as 60% of the Amazon is contained within Brazil, designated as the Brazil's Legal Amazon (Amazônia Legal, BLA). Since the 1970s, Brazil has consumed approximately 12 percent of the forest, representing roughly 77.7 million ha (192 million acres)—an area larger than that of the US state of Texas. Most of the deforestation has been for natural resources for the logging industry and land clearing for agricultural and mining use. Forest removal to make way for cattle ranching was the leading cause of deforestation in the Brazilian Amazon from the mid-1960s on. The Amazon region has become the largest cattle ranching territory in the world. According to the World Bank, some 80% of deforested land is used for cattle ranching. Seventy percent of formerly forested land in the Amazon, and 91% of land deforested since 1970, is used for livestock pasture. According to the Center for International Forestry Research (CIFOR), "between 1990 and 2001 the percentage of Europe's processed meat imports that came from Brazil rose from 40 to 74 percent" and by 2003 "for the first time ever, the growth in Brazilian cattle production, 80 percent of which was in the Amazon[,] was largely export driven." The Brazilian states of Pará, Mato Grosso, and Rondônia, located along the southern border of the Amazon rainforest, are in what is called the "deforestation arc".

Deforestation within Brazil is partially driven by growing demand for beef and soy exports, particularly to China and Hong Kong. In the first seven months of 2019, soy exports to China rose by 18% due to trading tensions between the United States and China. Brazil is one of the largest exporters of beef, accounting for more than 20% of global trade of the commodity. Brazil exported over 1.6 million tonnes of beef in 2018, the highest volume in recorded history. Brazil's cattle herd has increased by 56% over the last two decades. Ranchers wait until the dry season to slash-and-burn to give time for the cattle to graze. Soybean production has increased from 75.32 million metric tons in 2010/11 to 118.8 million metric tons in 2018/19. The Amazon accounts for 14 million of the 284 million acres of soy plantations in Brazil. While slash-and-burn can be controlled, unskilled farmers may end up causing wildfires. Wildfires have increased as the agricultural sector has pushed into the Amazon basin and spurred deforestation. In recent years, "land-grabbers" (grileiros) have been illegally cutting deep into the forest in "Brazil's indigenous territories and other protected forests throughout the Amazon".

View source data.
Number of fires in Brazil's Amazônia Legal between January 1 and August 26 by year, reported by INPE

Past data from INPE has shown the number of fires with the BLA from January to August in any year to be routinely higher than 60,000 fires from 2002 to 2007 and as high as 90,000 in 2003. Fire counts have generally been higher in years of drought (2007 and 2010), which are often coupled with El Niño events.

Within international attention on the protection of the Amazon around the early 2000s, Brazil took a more proactive approach to deforestation of the Amazon rainforest. In 2004, the Brazilian government had established the Federal Action Plan for Prevention and Control of Deforestation in the Amazon (PPCDAM), with the goal to reduce the rate of deforestation through land use regulation, environmental monitoring, and sustainable activities, promoted through partnerships at the federal and private level, and legal penalties for violations. Brazil also invested in more effective measures to fight fires, including fire-fighting airplanes in 2012. By 2014, USAID was teaching the indigenous people how to fight fires. As a result of enforcement of PPCDAM, the rate of deforestation in the Brazilian Amazon dropped 83.5% of their 2004 rates by 2012. However, in 2014, Brazil fell into an economic crisis, and as part of that recovery, pushed heavily on its exports of beef and soy to help bolster its economy, which caused a reversal in the falling deforestation rates. The Brazilian government has been defunding scientific research since the economic crisis.

To support PPCDAM, the INPE began developing systems to monitor the Amazon rainforest. One early effort was the Amazon Deforestation Satellite Monitoring Project (PRODES), which is a highly detailed satellite imagery-based approach to calculate wildfires and deforestation losses on an annual basis. In 2015, INPE launched five complementary projects as part of the Terra Brasilis project to monitor deforestation closer to real-time. Among these include the Real-Time Deforestation Detection System (DETER) satellite alert system, allowing them to capture incidents of wildfires in 15-day cycles. The daily data is published on the regularly updated Brazilian Environmental Institute government website, and later corroborated with the annual and more accurate PRODES data.

By December 2017, INPE had completed a modernization process and had expanded its system to analyze and share data on forest fires. It launched its new TerraMA2Q platform—software which adapts fire-monitoring data software including the "occurrence of irregular fires". Although the INPE was able to provide regional fire data since 1998, the modernization increased access. Agencies that monitor and fight fires include the Brazilian Federal Environment and Renewable Resources Agency (IBAMA), as well as state authorities. The INPE receives its images daily from 10 foreign satellites, including the Terra and Aqua satellites—part of the NASA's Earth Observation System (EOS). Combined, these systems are able to capture the number of fires on a daily basis, but this number does not directly measure the area of forest lost to these fires; instead, this is done with fortnightly imaging data to compare the current state of the forest with reference data to estimate acreage lost.

Jair Bolsonaro was elected as President of Brazil in October 2018 and took office in January 2019, after which he and his ministries changed governmental policies to weaken protection of the rainforest and make it favorable for farmers to continue practices of slash-and-burn clearing, thus accelerating the deforestation from previous years. Land-grabbers had used Bolsonaro's election to extend their activities into cutting in the land of the previously isolated Apurinã people in Amazonas where the "world's largest standing tracts of unbroken rainforest" are found. Upon entering office, Bolsonaro cut US$23 million from Brazil's environmental enforcement agency, making it difficult for the agency to regulate deforestation efforts. Bolsonaro and his ministers had also segmented the environmental agency, placing part of its control under the agricultural ministry, which is led by the country's farming lobby, weakened protections on natural reserves and territories belonging to indigenous people, and encouraged businesses to file counter-land claims against regions managed by sustainable forestry practices.

=== 2019 Brazil dry season fires ===
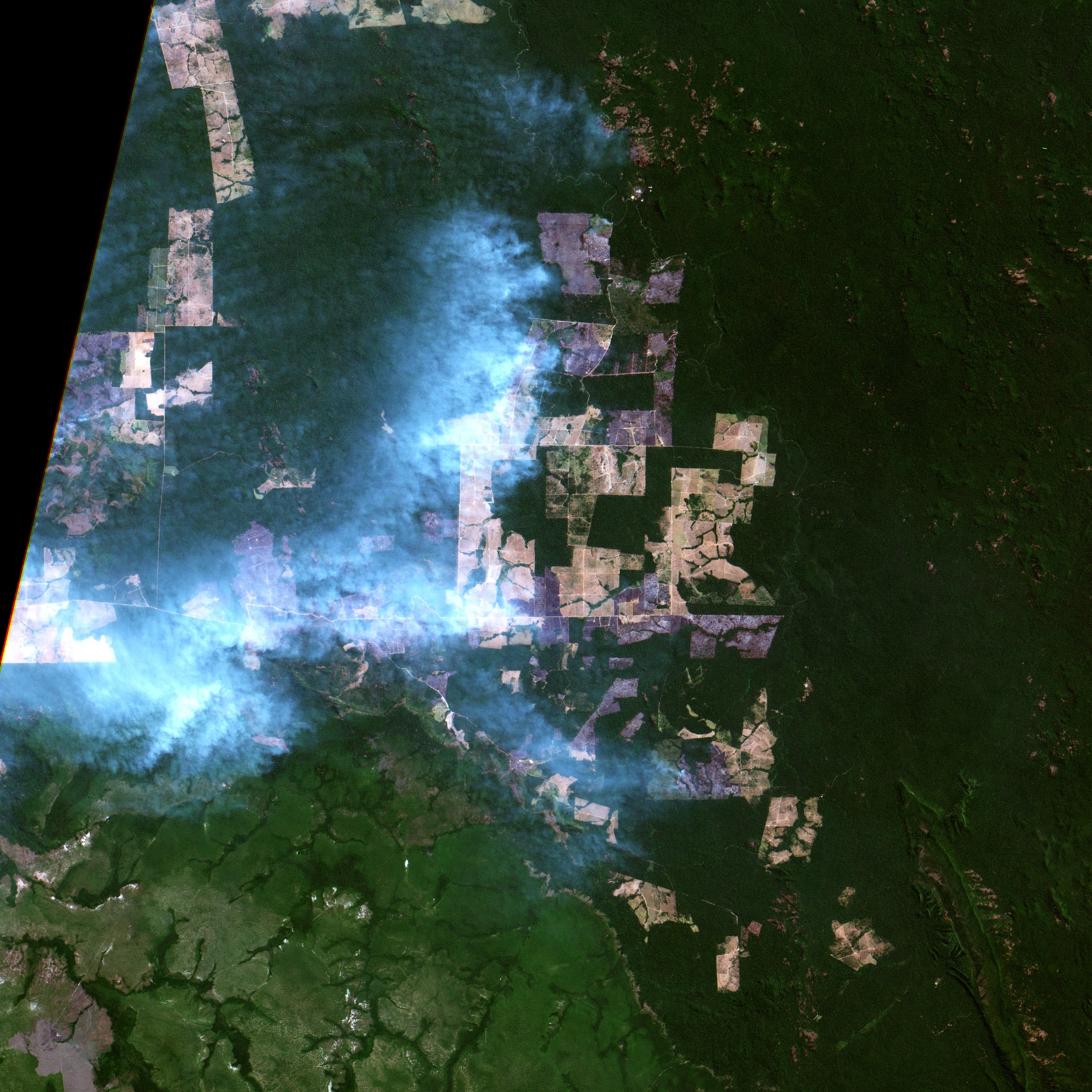
Agricultural fires in southern Pará, Brazil in August 2019.

INPE alerted the Brazilian government to larger-than-normal growth in the number of fires through June to August 2019. The first four months of the year were wetter-than-average, discouraging slash-and-burn efforts. However, with the start of the dry season in May 2019, the number of wildfires jumped greatly. Additionally, NOAA reported that, regionally, the temperatures in the January–July 2019 period were the second warmest year-to-date on record. INPE reported a year-to-year increase of 88% in wildfire occurrences in June 2019. There was further increase in the rate of deforestation in July 2019, with the INPE estimating that more than 1,345 square kilometres (519 mi^{2}; 134,500 ha; 332,000 acres) of land had been deforested in the month and would be on track to surpass the area of Greater London by the end of the month.

The month of August 2019 saw a large growth in the number of observed wildfires according to INPE. By August 11, Amazonas had declared a state of emergency. The state of Acre entered into an environmental alert on August 16. In early August, local farmers in the Amazonian state of Pará placed an ad in the local newspaper calling for a queimada or "Day of Fire" on August 10, 2019, organizing large scale slash-and-burn operations knowing that there was little chance of interference from the government. Shortly after, there was an increase in the number of wildfires in the region.

INPE reported on August 20 that it had detected 39,194 fires in the Amazon rainforest since January. This represented a 77 percent increase in the number of fires from the same time period in 2018. However, the NASA-funded NGO Global Fire Emissions Database (GFED) shows 2018 as an unusually low fire year compared to historic data from 2004 to 2005 which are years showing nearly double the number of counted fires. INPE had reported that at least 74,155 fires have been detected in all of Brazil, which represents an 84-percent increase from the same period in 2018. NASA originally reported in mid-August that MODIS satellites reported average numbers of fires in the region compared with data from the past 15 years; the numbers were above average for the year in the states of Amazonas and Rondônia, but below average for Mato Grosso and Pará. NASA later clarified that the data set they had evaluated previous was through August 16, 2019. By August 26, 2019, NASA included more recent MODIS imagery to confirm that the number of fires were higher than in previous years.

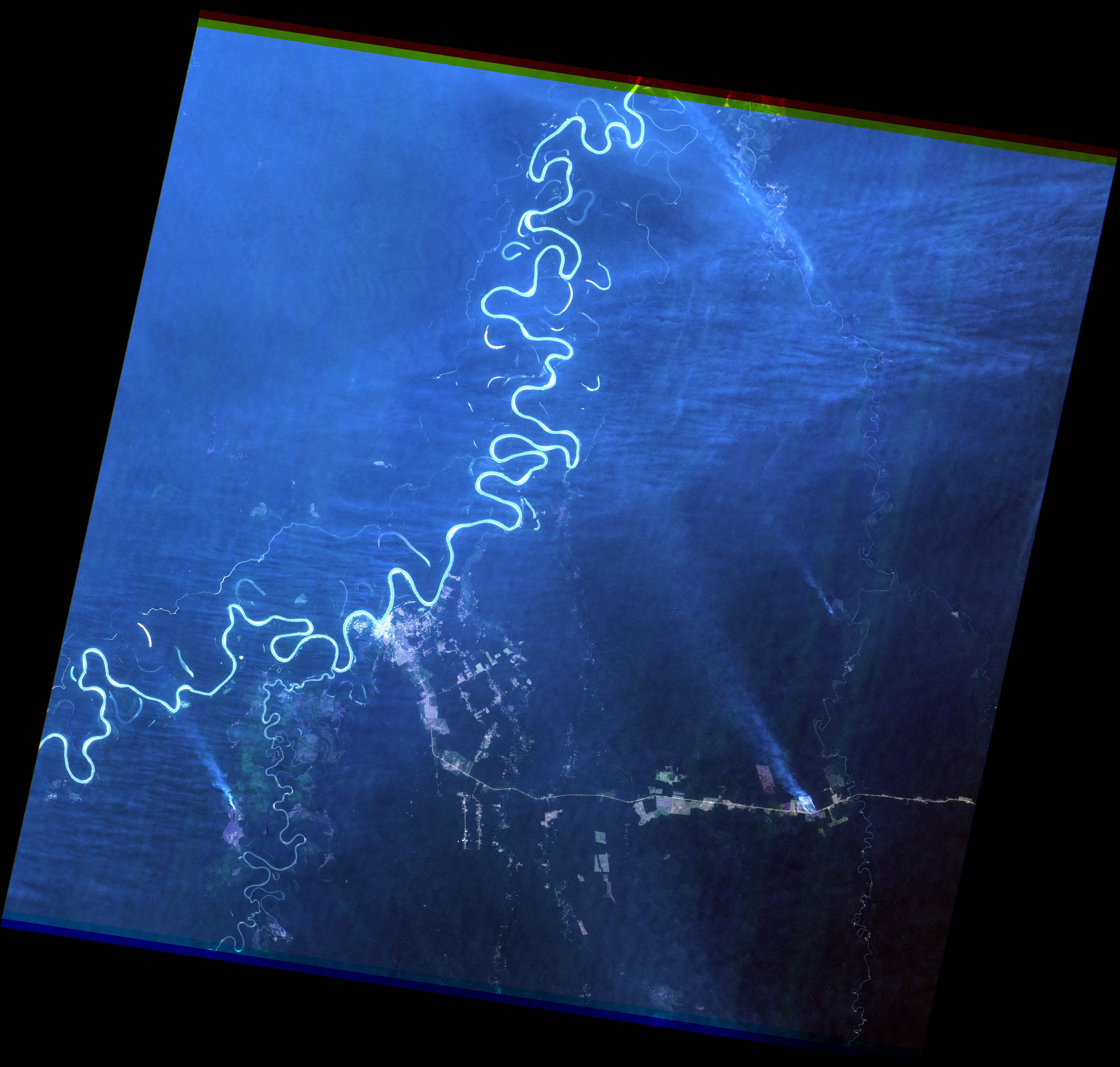
INPE satellite imagery of a 110 km × 110 km (70 mi × 70 mi) area along the Purus River between Canutama and Lábrea in the state of Amazonas, taken on August 16, 2019, showing several plumes of smoke from wildfires, including areas that have been deforested

	Number of wildfires detected by INPE from January 1 to August 26 in Brazil Highlighted rows are states within the BLA												
Year State	2013	Diff%	2014	Diff%	2015	Diff%	2016	Diff%	2017	Diff%	2018	Diff%	2019
Acre	782	47%	1,150	43%	1,649	72%	2,846	–57%	1,204	3%	1,246	134%	2,918
Alagoas	128	–9%	116	69%	197	–60%	78	5%	82	–19%	66	10%	73
Amazonas	1,809	117%	3,927	13%	4,457	22%	5,475	4%	5,730	–38%	3,508	117%	7,625
Amapá	28	75%	49	4%	51	–13%	44	–43%	25	88%	47	–48%	24
Bahia	2,226	–26%	1,631	12%	1,836	42%	2,614	–37%	1,634	–21%	1,280	86%	2,383
Ceará	281	12%	316	14%	361	36%	493	–57%	209	84%	385	–15%	327
Federal District	60	130%	138	–57%	59	179%	165	–31%	113	–63%	41	65%	68
Espírito Santo	186	–35%	120	119%	263	40%	370	–76%	87	2%	89	157%	229
Goiás	1,406	56%	2,202	–24%	1,658	53%	2,540	–22%	1,963	–28%	1,398	27%	1,786
Maranhão	4,427	89%	8,375	–1%	8,229	–13%	7,135	–29%	5,000	–4%	4,760	17%	5,596
Minas Gerais	2,067	48%	3,067	–44%	1,710	83%	3,134	–30%	2,179	–24%	1,647	77%	2,919
Mato Grosso do Sul	1,421	–28%	1,017	112%	2,165	14%	2,486	3%	2,583	–54%	1,171	285%	4,510
Mato Grosso	8,396	40%	11,811	–21%	9,278	56%	14,496	–31%	9,872	–19%	7,915	95%	15,476
Pará	3,810	145%	9,347	–6%	8,776	0%	8,704	25%	10,919	–62%	4,068	164%	10,747
Paraíba	72	75%	126	–35%	81	–4%	77	–48%	40	100%	80	1%	81
Pernambuco	174	–2%	170	43%	244	–58%	102	22%	125	–18%	102	29%	132
Piauí	1,666	122%	3,708	–23%	2,840	–2%	2,765	–36%	1,749	104%	3,569	–21%	2,818
Paraná	1,361	–9%	1,227	0%	1,234	52%	1,877	–9%	1,698	–9%	1,531	18%	1,810
Rio de Janeiro	192	133%	448	–21%	354	7%	379	–33%	251	–42%	144	175%	396
Rio Grande do Norte	71	–7%	66	28%	85	–32%	57	21%	69	44%	100	–32%	68
Rondônia	817	266%	2,990	31%	3,934	10%	4,349	–16%	3,624	–37%	2,270	183%	6,441
Roraima	951	85%	1,759	–14%	1,499	136%	3,541	–82%	622	218%	1,982	132%	4,608
Rio Grande do Sul	890	69%	1,505	–40%	901	188%	2,601	–37%	1,619	–35%	1,039	95%	2,029
Santa Catarina	969	–32%	652	0%	646	147%	1,600	–29%	1,133	–22%	883	25%	1,107
Sergipe	155	–56%	68	122%	151	–53%	71	–4%	68	11%	76	–18%	62
São Paulo	1,385	81%	2,515	–54%	1,148	100%	2,302	–29%	1,613	37%	2,212	–26%	1,616
Tocantins	4,436	38%	6,132	–16%	5,130	55%	7,962	–31%	5,461	–25%	4,047	59%	6,436
Total	40,166	60%	64,632	–8%	58,936	32%	78,263	–23%	59,672	–23%	45,656	80%	82,285

By August 29, 80,000 fires had broken out in Brazil which represents a 77% rise on the same period in 2018, according to BBC. INPE reported that in the period from January 1 to August 29, across South America, and not exclusive to the Amazon rainforest, there were 84,957 fires in Brazil, 26,573 in Venezuela, 19,265 in Bolivia, 14,363 in Colombia, 14,969 in Argentina, 10,810 in Paraguay, 6,534 in Peru, 2,935 in Chile, 898 in Guyana, 407 in Uruguay, 328 in Ecuador, 162 in Suriname, and 11 in French Guiana.

=== First media reports ===
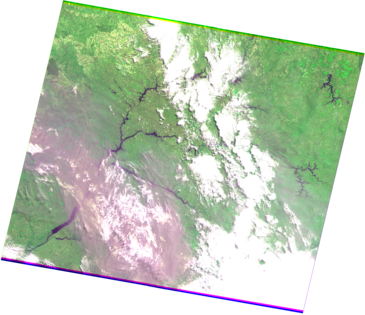
Smoke arriving at the Southeast region of Brazil on 19 August 2019 (CBERS-4)

While INPE's data had been reported in international sources earlier, news of the wildfires were not a major news story until around August 20, 2019. On that day, the smoke plume from the fires in Rondônia and Amazonas caused the sky to darken at around 2 p.m. over São Paulo—which is almost 2,800 kilometres (1,700 miles) away from the Amazon basin on the eastern coast. NASA and US National Oceanic and Atmospheric Administration (NOAA) also published satellite imagery from the Moderate Resolution Imaging Spectroradiometer (MODIS) on NASA's Terra satellite in alignment with INPE's own, that showed smoke plumes from the wildfires were visible from space. INPE and NASA data, along with photographs of the ongoing fires and impacts, caught international attention and became a rising topic on social media, with several world leaders, celebrities, and athletes expressing their concerns.

According to Vox, of all the concurrent wildfires elsewhere in the world, the wildfires in the Amazon rainforest in Brazil were the most "alarming".

=== Responses of the Brazilian government ===
Official pronouncement of Brazilian president Jair Bolsonaro.

In the months prior to August 2019, Bolsonaro mocked international and environmental groups that felt his pro-business actions enabled deforestation. At one point in August 2019, Bolsonaro jokingly calling himself "Captain Chainsaw" while asserting that INPE's data was inaccurate. After INPE announced an 88% increase of wildfires in July 2019, Bolsonaro claimed "the numbers were fake" and fired Ricardo Magnus Osório Galvão, the INPE director. Bolsonaro claimed Galvão was using the data to lead an "anti-Brazil campaign". Bolsonaro had claimed that the fires had been deliberately started by environmental NGOs, although he provided no evidence to back up the accusation. NGOs such as WWF Brasil, Greenpeace, and the Brazilian Institute for Environmental Protection countered Bolsonaro's claims.

Bolsonaro, on August 22, argued that Brazil did not have the resources to fight the fires, as the "Amazon is bigger than Europe, how will you fight criminal fires in such an area?".

Historically, Brazil has been guarded about international intervention into the BLA, as the country sees the forest as a critical part of Brazil's economy. Bolsonaro and his government have continued to speak out against any international oversight of the situation. Bolsonaro considered French President Emmanuel Macron's comments to have a "sensationalist tone" and accusing him of interfering in what he considers is a local problem. Of Macron and German Chancellor Angela Merkel, Bolsonaro stated: "They still haven't realized that Brazil is under new direction. That there's now a president who is loyal to [the] Brazilian people, who says the Amazon is ours, who says bad Brazilians can't release lying numbers and campaign against Brazil."

Bolsonaro's foreign minister Ernesto Araújo has also condemned the international criticism of Bolsonaro's reaction to the wildfires, calling it "savage and unfair" treatment towards Bolsonaro and Brazil. Araújo stated that: "President Bolsonaro's government is rebuilding Brazil", and that foreign nations were using the "environmental crisis" as a weapon to stop this rebuilding. General Eduardo Villas Bôas, former commander of the Brazilian Army, considered the criticism of world leaders, like Macron and Canadian Prime Minister Justin Trudeau, to be directly challenging "Brazilian sovereignty", and may need to be met with military response.

'National Force sends 30 firefighters to act against Amazon fires' - video published by the Bolsonaro government on August 25, 2019

With increased pressure from the international community, Bolsonaro appeared more willing to take proactive steps against the fires, saying by August 23, 2019, that his government would take a "zero tolerance" approach to environmental crimes. He engaged the Brazilian military to help fight the wildfires on August 24, which Joint Staff member Lt. Brig. Raul Botelho stated was to create a "positive perception" of the government's efforts. Among military support included 43,000 troops as well as four firefighting aircraft, and an allocated US$15.7 million for fire-fighting operations. Initial efforts were principally located in the state of Rondônia, but the Defense Ministry stated they plan to offer support for all seven states affected by the fires. On August 28, Bolsonaro signed a decree banning the setting of fires in Brazil for a period of 60 days, making exceptions for those fires made purposely to maintain environmental forest health, to combat wildfires, and by the indigenous people of Brazil. However, as most fires are set illegally, it is unclear what impact this decree could have.

Rodrigo Maia, president of the Chamber of Deputies, announced that he would form a parliatary committee to monitor the problem. In addition, he said that the Chamber will hold a general commission in the following days to assess the situation and propose solutions to the government.

After a report from Globo Rural reveal that a WhatsApp group of 70 people was involved with the Day of Fire, Jair Bolsonaro determined the opening of investigations by Federal Police.

In a webcast issued November 28, 2019, President Jair Bolsonaro blamed actor and environmentalist Leonardo DiCaprio for the rainforest wildfires, alleging NGOs set the fires in return for donations. DiCaprio, Global Wildlife Conservation, and IUCN Species Survival Commission condemn Bolsonaro's accusations.

Brazil banned clearing land by setting fire to it on 29 August 2019.

More measures taken by the Brazilian government of Jair Bolsonaro to stop the fires include:

- Accepting 4 planes from Chile to battle the fires.
- Accepting 12 million dollars of aid from the United Kingdom government
- Softening his position about aid from the G7.
- Appealing for an international conference to preserve the Amazon with participation of all countries that have some part of the Amazon rainforest in their territory

=== Protests against Brazilian government policies ===
'Crowd march in defense of the Amazon and against the environmental policies of Bolsonaro' - video news report from Abya Yala TV in Bolivia.

In regards to the displacement of the indigenous people, Amnesty International has highlighted the change in protection of lands belonging to the indigenous people, and have called on other nations to pressure Brazil to restore these rights, as they are also essential to protecting the rainforest. Ivaneide Bandeira Cardoso, founder of Kanindé, a Porto Velho-based advocacy group for indigenous communities, said Bolsonaro is directly responsible for the escalation of forest fires throughout the Amazon this year. Cardoso said the wildfires are a "tragedy that affects all of humanity" since the Amazon plays an important role in the global ecosystem as a carbon sink to reduce the effects of climate change.

Thousands of Brazilian citizens held protests in several major cities from August 24, 2019, onward to challenge the government's reaction to the wildfires. Protesters around the world also held events at Brazilian embassies, including in London, Paris, Mexico City, and Geneva.

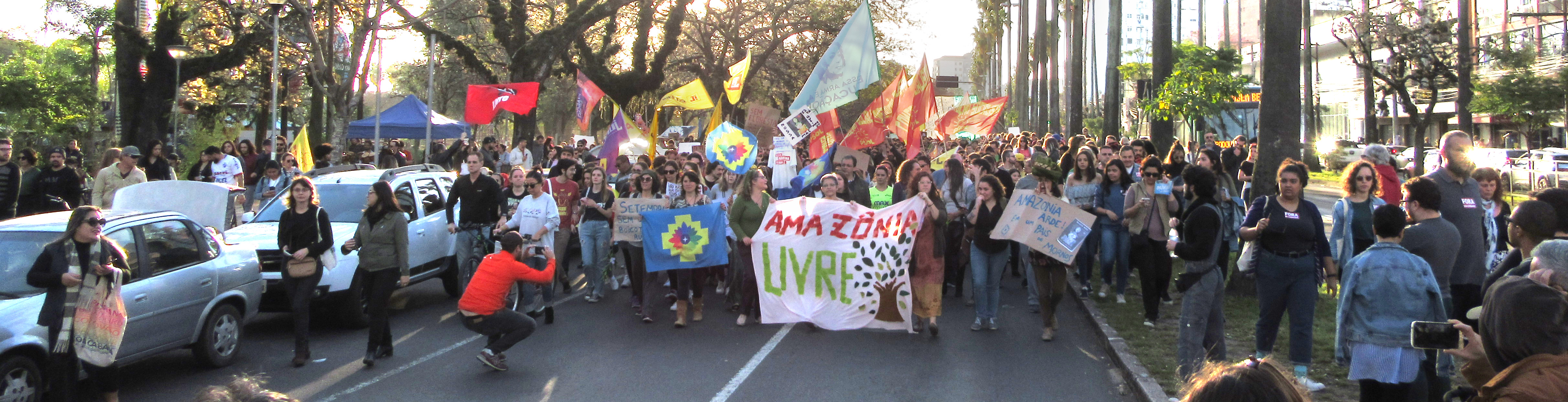
Protest in Porto Alegre on August 24, 2019

=== Impact on the indigenous peoples of Brazil ===
In addition to environmental harm, the slash-and-burn actions leading to the wildfires have threatened the approximately 306,000 indigenous people in Brazil who reside near or within the rainforest. Bolsonaro had spoken out against the need to respect the demarcation of lands for indigenous people established in the 1988 Constitution of Brazil. According to a CBC report on Brazil's wildfires, representatives of the indigenous people have stated that farmers, loggers, and miners, emboldened by the Brazilian government's policies, have forced these people out of their lands, sometimes through violent means, and equated their methods with genocide. Additionally, some indigenous groups that have traditionally used fire management practices for agricultural livelihoods are being criminalized. Some of these tribes have vowed to fight back against those engaged in deforestation to protect their lands. Kerexu Yxapyry, a leader from Santa Catarina's Kerexu tribe, describes this conflict as, "We know our struggle will be arduous. Maybe many of our leaders will be killed, but we are organized. And we are going to defend our rights."

For more on the impacts of displacement on populations,

=== International responses ===
Video news report from Todo Noticias based in Argentina, showing burned forest

International leaders and environmental NGOs have condemned President Bolsonaro for the extent of the wildfires within the Brazilian portion of the Amazon.

Several international governments and environmental groups raised concerns at Bolsonaro's stance on the rainforest and the lack of attempts by his government to slow the wildfires. Among the most vocal was Macron, given the proximity of French Guiana to Brazil. Macron called the Amazon wildfires an "international crisis", while claiming the rainforest produces "20% of the world's oxygen"—a statement disputed by academics. (Note: BBC (2019): "Many claim on social media that the Amazon produces about 20% of the world's oxygen. [...] But academics say this is a very common misconception, and that the figure is less than 10%.") (Note: Scientific American (2019): "The oft-repeated claim that the Amazon rainforest produces 20% of our planet's oxygen is based on a misunderstanding. In fact nearly all of Earth's breathable oxygen originated in the oceans, and there is enough of it to last for millions of years. There are many reasons to be appalled by this year's Amazon fires, but depleting Earth's oxygen supply is not one of them.") He said, "Our house is burning. Literally."

Discussion about the fires came into the final negotiations of the EU–Mercosur Free Trade Agreement between the EU and Mercosur, a trade bloc of Argentina, Brazil, Uruguay, and Paraguay. With the wildfires on-going, both Macron and Irish Prime Minister Leo Varadkar have stated they will refuse to ratify the trade deal unless Brazil commits to protecting the environment. However, they have both been accused of using the fires as a pretext to scuttle an agreement that they already opposed on protectionist grounds.

Finance minister of Finland Mika Lintilä suggested the idea of an EU ban on Brazilian beef imports until the country takes steps to stop the deforestation.

The Secretary-General of the Rainforest Foundation Norway (RFN), Øyvind Eggen, said that neither the "official deforestation figures" published by Brazilian authorities on November 18, 2019, nor the number of wildfires in Amazon in 2019, were normal. According to the RFN,"We are approaching a potential tipping point, where large parts of the forest will be so damaged that [the rainforest] collapses."

=== Preserving the Amazon: A Shared Moral Imperative ===
On September 10, 2019, the US House Foreign Affairs Committee held a hearing in Washington, DC entitled "Preserving the Amazon: A Shared Moral Imperative". In her testimony presented to the hearing, Peterson Institute for International Economics (PIIE) economist, Monica de Bolle likened the rainforest to a "carbon bomb", as the fires lit for deforestation "may release as much as 200 million tons of carbon into the atmosphere a year, which would spur climate change at a much faster rate, not to mention associated changes in rainfall patterns that may result from deforestation."

== Fires in Bolivia ==
GOESEast imagery of the southern edge of the Amazon Rainforest, plumes of smoke from agricultural fires burning in Bolivia and Brazil on Aug. 4, 2019

=== Background ===
In Bolivia, chaqueo is an annual seasonal agricultural practice and commonly relies on the controlled use of fire. It was first authorized in 2001 during the government of Hugo Banzer Suarez.

Bolivia has 7.7 percent of the Amazon rainforest within its borders. The Bolivian Amazon covers 19.402 million hectares (47.94 million acres) which comprise 37.7 percent of Bolivia's forests and 17.7 percent of Bolivia's land mass. Bolivia's forests cover a total of 51.407 million hectares (127.03 million acres), including the Chiquitano dry forests which is part of the Amazon biome and a transition zone between the Amazon rainforest and the drier forests of the southern Chaco region.

By September 14, 2019, Bolivia—which is one-eighth the size of Brazil—lost nearly 6 million acres (2.4 million hectares) of "forest and savanna". The fires destroyed about the same area of rainforest than in Brazil.

=== Santa Cruz Department ===
By August 16, Bolivia's Santa Cruz had declared a departmental emergency because of the forest fires. From August 18 to August 23, approximately 800 thousand hectares (2.0 million acres) of the Chiquitano dry forests were destroyed, more than what was lost over a typical two-year period. By August 24, the fires had already affected 1,011 thousand hectares (2.50 million acres) of forestland in the Santa Cruz and were burning near Santa Cruz, Bolivia. By August 26, wildfires had reached over 728 thousand hectares (1.80 million acres) of Bolivia's savanna and tropical forests, according to the Bolivian Information Agency (BIA). Over a period of five days, from August 18 to August 22, 450 thousand hectares (1.1 million acres) of forest near Roboré were burned.

On August 25, 4,000 state employees and volunteers were fighting the fires. By August 25, the Chiquitano regions has seen 650 thousand hectares (1.6 million acres) of tropical forest burned within both the Amazon and the dry forests, mostly within the Santa Cruz province; like the Brazil fires, such fires occur during the dry season, but the number of fires in 2019 were larger than in previous years. Throughout August, wildfires have been spreading across four states. [By August 26, fires in the Dionisio Foianini Triangle—the Brazil-Bolivia-Paraguay triangle had reached savannah and tropical forest "near Bolivia's border with Paraguay and Brazil".

The Bolivian government intervened after it was clear that the fires had surpassed local and regional response capabilities. In the week of August 18, Morales dispatched soldiers and three helicopters to fight fires in an area about the size of Oregon. On August 22, Morales contracted the Colorado-based Boeing 747 Supertanker (also known as Global SuperTanker) to conduct firefighting missions over the Bolivian Amazon. The 747 Supertanker is the largest firefighting aircraft in the world, which can hold approximately 19,000 gallons of water per trip. Morales has stated that the governments of many countries including Spain, Chile, Perú, France, the EU, among others have reached out to him to provide help for fighting the fires.

The government had been trying to determine the cause of the fires, with the Bolivian land management authority attributing 87% of the fires present in areas without authorization. Multiple NGOs assert that deforestation rates in Bolivia increased 200 percent after the government quadrupled available land for deforestation to small farmers in 2015.

Political opponents of Morales alleged that the Supreme Decree 3973, a mandate to further beef production in the Amazon region, is a major cause of the Bolivian fires. However, this Supreme Decree only extends the authorized but regulated use of fire already legal in Santa Cruz to the Beni Department, where forest fire issues are not a significant issue.

By September 9, total forests that had been affected by fires in Bolivia was estimated as 1,700 thousand hectares (4.2 million acres), more than double from estimates two weeks prior, but far less extended than the forest fires that occurred in 2004 and 2010. While some local government officials and opposition leaders have pled with Morales to update the situation from national emergengy to national disaster, but minister of communication Manuel Canelas said that Bolivia "is not overwhelmed" by fires to make this declaration, and that national emergency is sufficient to receive any type of foreign cooperation.

== Fires in Paraguay's Pantanal ==
Burn scars in Bolivia, Brazil, and Paraguay captured by GOES-16 on August 22, 2019

By August 22, fire emergencies in Paraguay's Alto Paraguay district and the UNESCO protected Pantanal region were issued by its federal government. Paraguay President Mario Abdo Benítez was in close contact with Bolivia's Morales to coordinate response efforts. By August 17, as wind direction changed, flames from fires in Bolivia began to enter northern Paraguay's Three Giants natural reserve in the Paraguayan Pantanal natural region. By August 24, when the situation had stabilized, Paraguay had lost 39,000 hectares (96,000 acres) in the Pantanal. An Universidad Nacional de Asunción representative lamented the disaster failed to attract as much media attention as the fires in the Amazon rainforest.

While most of the Pantanal regions—140,000 and 195,000 square kilometres (54,000 and 75,000 sq mi)—is within Brazil's borders in the state of Mato Grosso do Sul, the natural region also extends into Mato Grosso and portions of Bolivia. It sprawls over an area estimated at between 140,000 and 195,000 square kilometres (54,000 and 75,000 sq mi). Within the Pantanal natural region, which is located between Brazil and Bolivia, is the "world's largest tropical wetland area". According one of the engineers charged with monitoring satellite data showing the "evolution of the fires", the Pantanal is a "complex, fragile, and high-risk ecosystem because it's being transformed from a wetland to a productive system". The Pantana is bounded by the Humid Chaco to the south, the Arid Chaco dry forests to the southwest, Cerrado savannas lie to the north, east and southeast, and the Chiquitano dry forests, to the west and northwest, where thousands of hectares burned in Bolivia.

A national parks researcher said that outsiders only know the Amazon, which is a "shame because the Pantanal is a very important ecological place". The Paraná River, which flows through Argentina, Brazil and Paraguay, is the "second largest river system in South America".

== Fires in Peru ==
Peru had nearly twice the growth in the number of fires in 2019 than Brazil, with most believed to be illegally set by ranchers, miners, and coca growers. Much of the fires are in the Madre de Dios which borders Brazil and Bolivia, though the fires there are not a result of those started in the other countries, according to the regional authority. However, they are still concerned about the impact of downwind emissions, particularly carbon monoxide, on residents of Madre de Dios. There were 128 forest fires reported in Peru in August 2019.

== Environmental impacts of the fires ==
=== Emissions ===
Images created by the Atmospheric Infrared Sounder which depict carbon monoxide caused by fires in the Amazon region of Brazil from Aug. 8-22, 2019.

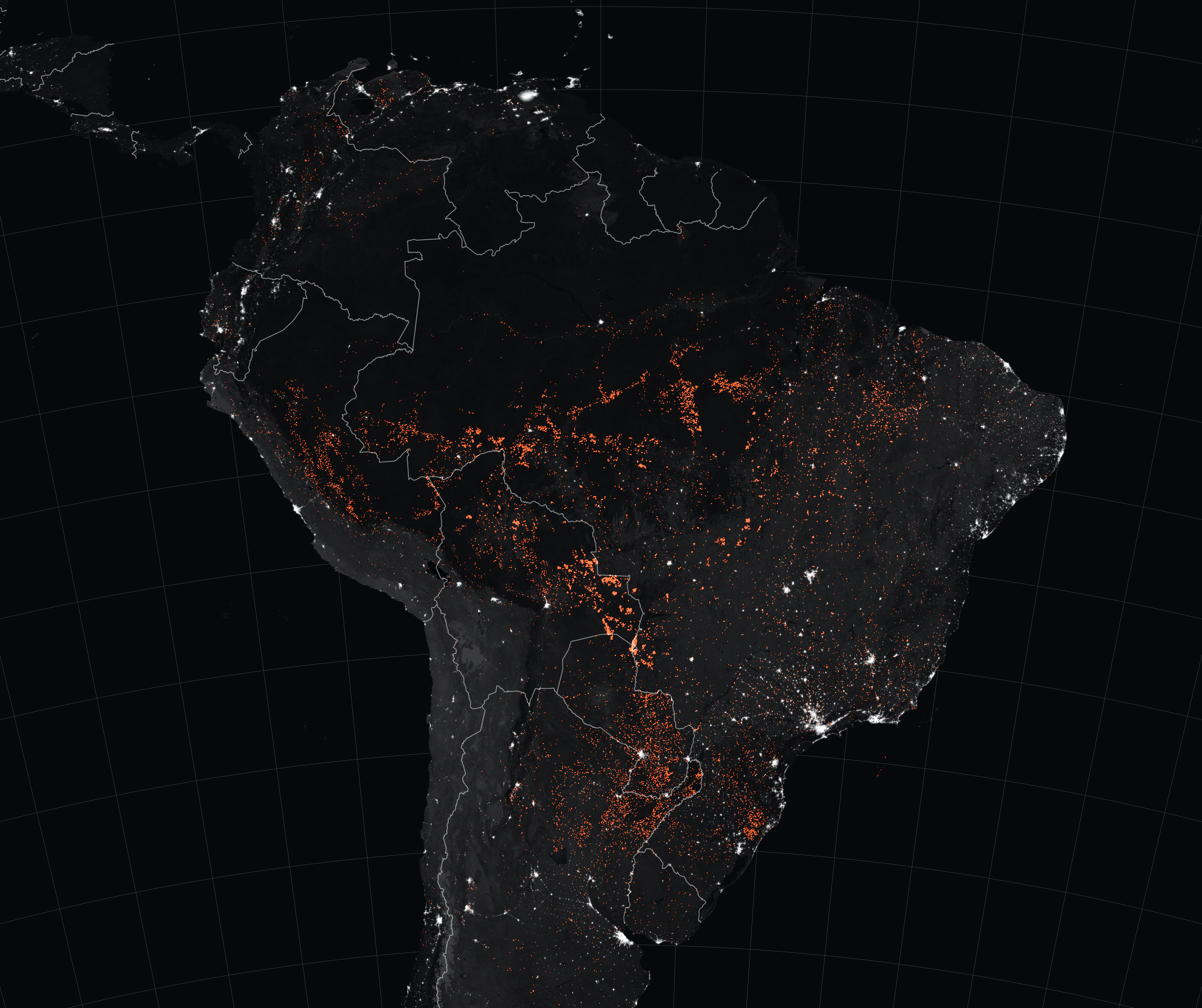
Locations of active wildfires (marked in orange) in the Amazon as of 22 August 2019

By August 22, NASA's AIRS published maps of increased carbon monoxide and carbon dioxide resulting from Brazil's wildfires. On the same day, the European Union's Copernicus Climate Change Service reported a "discernible spike" in emissions of carbon monoxide and carbon dioxide generated by the fires.

Areas downwind of the fires have become covered with smoke, which can potentially last upwards of months at a time if the fires are left to burn out. Hospitals in cities like Porto Velho had reported over three times the average number of cases of patients affected by smoke over the same year-to-year period in August 2019 than in other previous years. Besides hindering breathing, the smoke can exacerbates patients with asthma or bronchitis and have potential cancer risk, generally affecting the youth and elderly the most.

=== Biodiversity ===
According to the World Wildlife Fund, the jaguar, for example, is already "near threatened" and the loss of food supplies and habitat due to the fires make the situation more critical.

Scientists at the Natural History Museum in London described how while some forests have adapted to fire as "important part of a forest ecosystem's natural cycle", the Amazon rainforest—which is "made up of lowland, wetland forests"—is "not well-equipped to deal with fire". Other Amazon basin ecosystems, like the Cerrado region, with its "large savannah, and lots of plants there have thick, corky, fire-resistant stems", is "fire-adapted".

Mazeika Sullivan, associate professor at Ohio State University's School of Environment and Natural Resources, explained that the fires could have a massive toll on wildlife in the short term as many animals in the Amazon are not adapted for extraordinary fires. Sloths, lizards, anteaters, and frogs may unfortunately perish in larger numbers than others due to their small size and lack of mobility. Endemic species, like Milton's titi and Mura's saddleback tamarin, are believed to be beset by the fires. Aquatic species could also be affected due to the fires changing the water chemistry into a state unsuitable for life. Long-term effects could be more catastrophic. Parts of the Amazon rainforest's dense canopy were destroyed by the fires, therefore, exposing the lower levels of the ecosystem, which then alters the energy flow of the food chain. The fires affect water chemistry (such as decreasing the amount of dissolved oxygen in the water), temperature, and erosion rates, which in turn affects fish and mammals that depend on fish, such as the giant otter.

== International actions ==
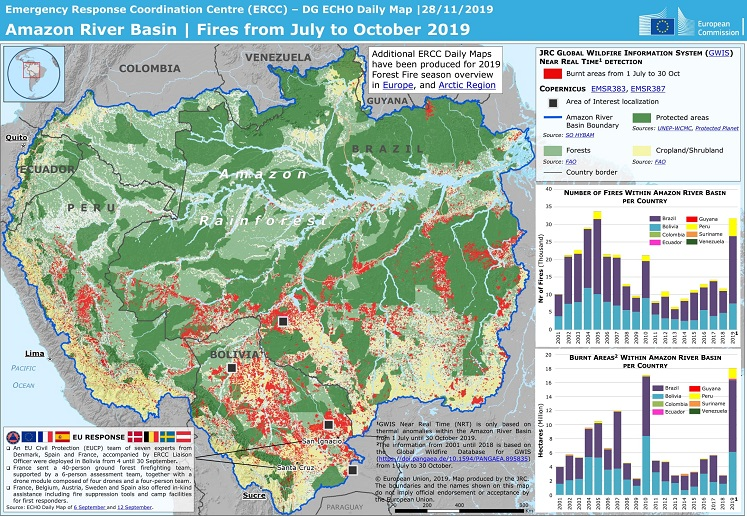
The EU response to the Amazon rainforest wildfires

On August 22, the Bishops Conference for Latin America called the fires a "tragedy" and urged the UN, the international community, and governments of Amazonian countries, to "take serious measures to save the world's lungs". Colombian President Ivan Duque stated he wanted to lead a conservation pact with the other nations that share the Amazon rainforest with plans to present this to the UN General Assembly. Duque said, "We must understand the protection of our Mother Earth and our Amazon is a duty, a moral duty."

United Nations Secretary General António Guterres stated on August 23, that: "In the midst of the global climate crisis, we cannot afford more damage to a major source of oxygen and biodiversity."

=== G7 Summit and emergency aid ===
Attention to the wildfires increased in the week prior to the G7 summit discussions on August 24–26 in Biarritz, France, led by President Macron. Macron stated his intent to open discussions related to the wildfires in the Brazilian part of the Amazon and Bolsonaro's response to them. Merkel has also backed Macron's statements and planned to make the issue a part of the G7 discussions; via a spokesperson, Merkel stated: "The extent of the fires in the Amazon area is shocking and threatening, not only for Brazil and the other affected countries, but also for the whole world." Macron further stated that possible international statute to protect the rainforest may be needed "if a sovereign state took concrete actions that clearly went against the interest of the planet". Bolsonaro expressed concern to United States president Donald Trump, that with Brazil not part of the G7, the country would be unrepresented in any such debate. Trump offered to take the position of the Brazilian government to the meeting and said that the US government did not agree to discuss the issue without Brazil's presence. Trump himself was absent from the environmental portion of the summit held on August 26, 2019, that discussed the fires and climate change, though members of his advisory team were in attendance.

During the summit, Macron and Chilean president Sebastián Piñera negotiated with the other nations to authorize US$22 million in emergency funding to Amazonian countries to help fight the fires. The Trump administration did not approve of the measure as the funding set certain requirements on its use. When the final negotiations were completed, Bolsonaro stated that he would refuse those funds for Brazil, claiming that Macron's interests were about protecting France's agricultural business in French Guiana from Brazil's competition. Bolsonaro also criticised Macron by comparing the Amazon fires to the Notre-Dame de Paris fire earlier in 2019, suggesting Macron should take care of their internal fires before reaching out internationally. The governors of the states of Brazil most affected by the fires pressured Bolsonaro to accept the aid given. Bolsonaro later clarified that he would accept foreign aid for the fires, but only if Brazil has the authority to determine how it is used.

=== Amazon country summit ===
Brazil's Bolsonaro stated on August 28, 2019, that the countries sharing the Amazon rainforest, excluding Venezuela, will hold a summit in Colombia on September 6, 2019, to discuss the ongoing Amazon fire situation. Representatives from seven countries attended: Brazil, Colombia, Peru, Ecuador, Bolivia, Guyana and Suriname. The countries signed a pact to coordinate monitoring of the Amazon forest and disaster response, and a better information network to coordinate their responses. The pact will also seek cooperative efforts to reduce the need for illegal deforestation in their countries.

== 2019 wildfires in the media ==
'Bolivia and Paraguay agree to work together to mitigate fire in the Amazon' - video news report from Abya Yala TV in Bolivia.

The media coverage had also broadly overshadowed the Amazon fires in Bolivia, Peru, and Paraguay by the fires and international impact of those in the BLA. The Amazon wildfires also occurred shortly after major wildfires reported in Greenland and Siberia after a globally hotter-than-average June and July, drawing away coverage of these natural disasters.

Some of these photographs shared on social media were from past fire events in the Amazon or from fires elsewhere. Agence France-Presse and El Comercio published guides to help people "fact-check" on misleading photos.

== Celebrity responses to Amazon wildfires ==
American actor Leonardo DiCaprio said his environmental organization Earth Alliance is donating $5 million to local groups and indigenous communities to help protect the Amazon. In a webcast on November 28, 2019, President Jair Bolsonaro said DiCaprio's donations encourage NGOs to set the fires in return for donations, a charge DiCaprio, Global Wildlife Conservation, and IUCN Species Survival Commission vehemently denied.

Instagram has been a platform for many celebrities who have spoken out about the wildfires such as Cara Delevingne, who posted a picture of the wildfires with the caption "#PrayForAmazonia".

Other celebrities who made public contributions include actresses Vanessa Hudgens and Lana Condor, and Japanese musician Yoshiki.

On August 26, 2019, Europe's richest man, Bernard Arnault, declared that his LVMH group will donate $11 million to aid in the fight against the Amazon rainforest wildfires.

American restaurateur Eddie Huang said he is going vegan as a result of the 2019 Amazon fires. Khloé Kardashian urged her 98 million Instagram followers to adopt a plant-based diet for the same reason. Leonardo DiCaprio told his Instagram followers to "eliminate or reduce consumption of beef" as "cattle ranching is one of the primary drivers of deforestation."

2021 single "Amazonia" by French metal band Gojira and its music video are a response the fires.

== See also ==
- 2019 Alberta wildfires
- 2019 California wildfires
- 2019 Siberia wildfires
- 2019 United Kingdom wildfires
- 2019 Washington wildfires
- 2019 wildfire season
- 2019 Southeast Asian haze
- 2019–20 Australian bushfire season
- 2020 Brazil rainforest wildfires
- 2024 Brazil wildfires
- 2025 South American wildfires
- Deforestation in Brazil
