= Apurinã (disambiguation) =

Apurinã or Ipurina may refer to:

- Apurinã people: An indigenous South American people from western Brazil
- Apurinã language: Their Maipurean language
