= Forest and Land Authority =

This is about the forest and land association of Bolivia

The Forest and Land Inspection and Social Control Authority (Spanish: Autoridad de Fiscalización y Control Social de Bosques y Tierras, ABT) is the agency of the Bolivian national government that oversees the use and transformation of lands, particularly on matters that concern agriculture and forest cover. It was created by Supreme Decree 071, issued by President Evo Morales on 9 April 2009. The agency superseded the Superintendencia Forestal y Agraria, and has been part of the Ministry of Environment and Water since 10 February 2010.

Cliver Rocha served as Director of the Authority from 2010 to 2014, and again from December 2018 to September 2019, when he was removed amid the controversial 2019 Bolivia forest fires.
