= 2019 Canary Islands wildfires =

Series of fires in the Canary Islands

2019 Canary Islands Wildfires
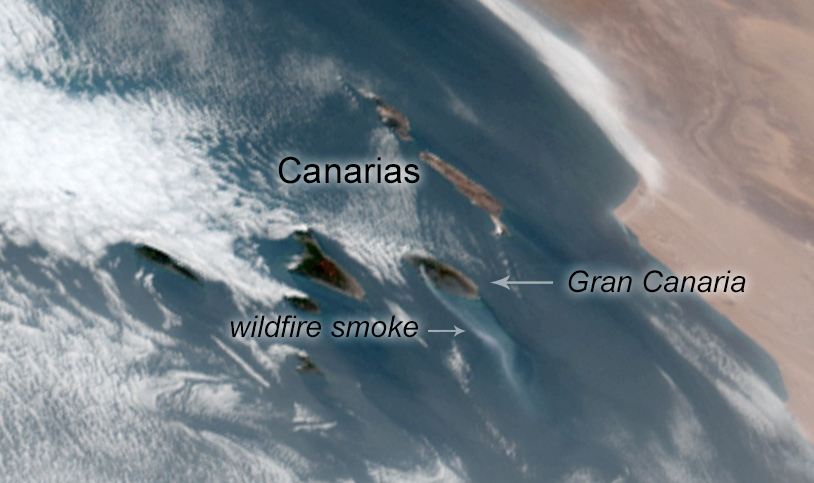
- Satellite view of smoke from the fires on Gran Canaria
- Date: August 2019
- Location: Canary Islands

During August 2019, a number of forest fires broke out in the Canary Islands of Gran Canaria, Tenerife and Lanzarote. The fires on the island of Gran Canaria were the most severe, resulting in the loss of large areas of the island's forests and leading to the evacuation of thousands of residents from a number of towns and villages. The intense heat brought by a heat wave and the presence of strong winds, combined with the island's mountainous terrain, made extinguishing activities exceptionally difficult.

== Gran Canaria ==
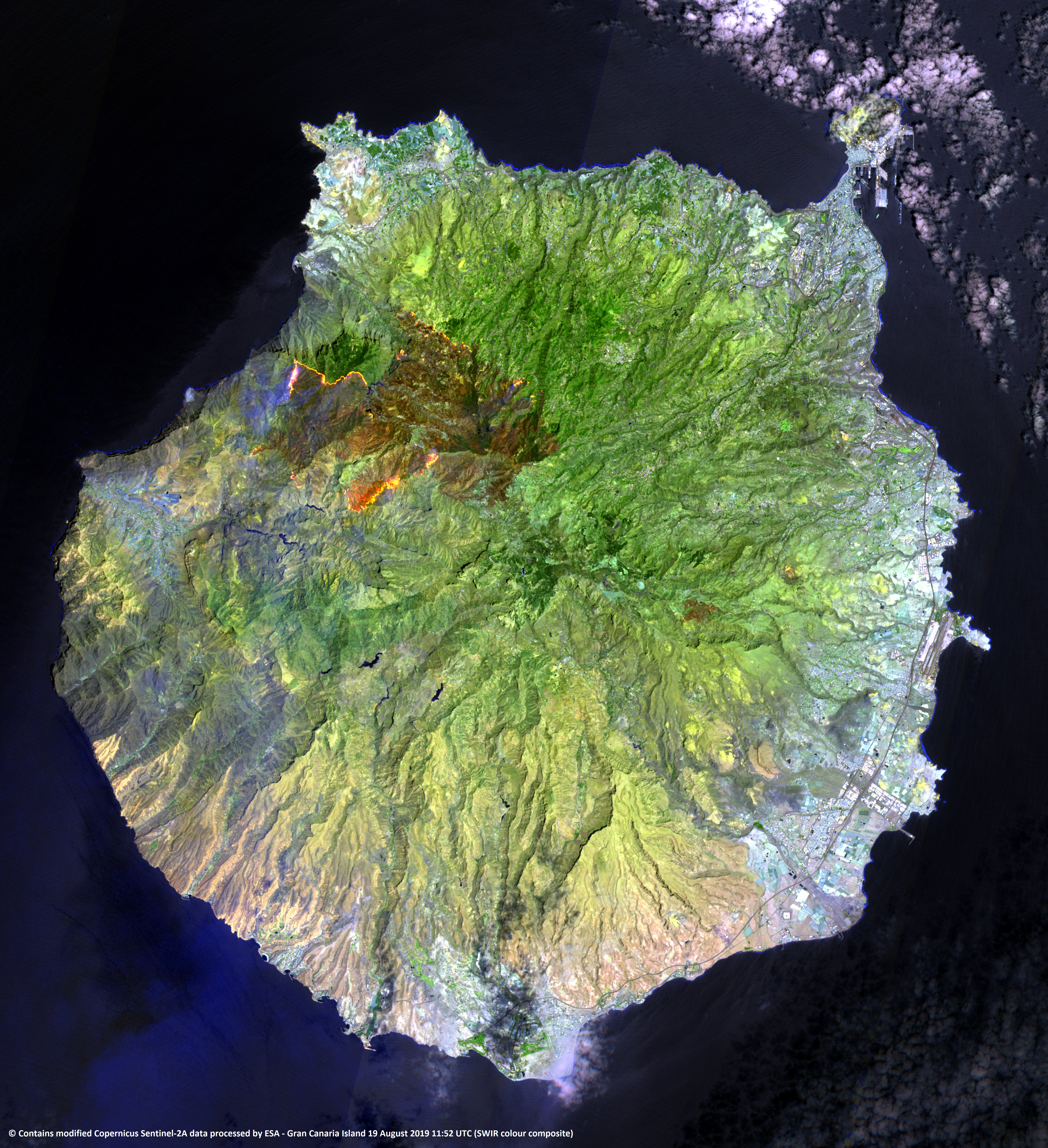
False colour image by the ESA, captured on 19 August 2019, showing fires in bright orange and burn scars in dark brown.

=== Artenara ===
The first forest fire was started by inadvertent human action on 10 August 2019 in Artenara. The 55-year-old who was working with a welding machine and accidentally caused the fire was arrested.

By 12 August, the fire had been contained but not extinguished. 1,000 hectares (2,500 acres) of land had been burnt by then and over 1000 local residents had been evacuated.

The wildfire was declared to have been stabilised on 13 August after 13 aircraft had been working on firefighting activities. A total of 1,500 hectares (3,700 acres) had been affected by then. By 16 August, residents had been allowed to move back into their homes. On 25 August, the fire was declared to have been completely extinguished.

=== Cazadores ===
A second fire broke out in Cazadores on 13 August, in the municipality of Telde, causing the evacuation of 25 residents. This smaller fire was started by a pyromaniac who was later arrested. By 14 August, the fire had been brought under control after having burnt through about 160 hectares (400 acres) of land. On 25 August, the fire was declared to have been completely extinguished.

=== Valleseco ===
On 17 August, during an intense heat wave, another wildfire broke out around the town of Valleseco. As of 19 August, the fire had destroyed around 3400 hectares, resulting in the evacuation of about 8000 people from approximately 40 towns in the region, including those affected by the Artenara wildfire just a few days ago. The fire has also reached the Tamadaba natural park.

The firefighting operation involved 16 aircraft and about 700 firefighters; however, the high temperatures, strong winds and low humidity levels were hampering the efforts and the wildfire could not be contained, with authorities declaring it to be "completely out of control". Flames as high as 50 metres (160 ft) made some areas inaccessible for the water-dropping planes.

On 20 August, and thanks, in part, to the improved weather conditions, the wildfire began to die down. Some fronts had been contained while others were still unapproachable. The affected area had grown to 10,000 hectares (25,000 acres) (over 6% of the entire island), making it the worst fire in all of Spain in the last six years. Overall, around 9000 people from over 50 towns and villages were evacuated from their homes.

By 22 August, the fire had been stabilised but not yet extinguished. Around 7500 people of those evacuated were allowed to return to their homes.

The fire originated very close to an electricity pylon and the cause of the fire was found to be a fault with electrical wiring on the pylon that caused a spark. Two and a half months earlier a level-one fire occurred in exactly in the same place, but like most fires on the island was quickly extinguished. It is also clear that the hot, windy and dry weather conditions greatly contributed to the fire's rapid propagation. Many also blamed the neglect of local authorities for not having cleared the thick undergrowth and dry leaves accumulated on the forest floor, further fuelling the fire. In addition, firefighters pointed at the poor political management of emergencies on the island, inadequate work conditions, a shortage of firefighters and the fact that the nearest fire station to the forest fire had been closed for the past eight years. The president of the cabildo insular (island council), Antonio Morales, disagreed with these claims stating that a team of extraordinary professionals works throughout the year on preventive measures such as firewalls. Instead, Morales put the onus on the owners of private terrains who do not adequately maintain their properties.

==== Damage to protected areas ====
The wildfire affected the areas surrounding Risco Caído and the Sacred Mountains of Gran Canaria a month after the site was declared a UNESCO World Heritage Site. According to reports, the fire did not damage the actual archeological site.

According to early reports, 84% of the over 10,000 hectares (25,000 acres) of land affected by the wildfire, i.e. 8,709.5 hectares (21,522 acres), was part of protected natural spaces.

Protected natural spaces affected by the wildfire
Protected natural space	Total area (ha)	Affected area (ha)	Affected area (%)
Las Cumbres protected landscape	4,273.97	1,953.63	45.71
Montañón Negro natural monument	189.78	189.78	100.00
Doramas rural park	3,883.21	152.61	3.93
Tamadaba natural park	7,487.89	2,713.61	36.24
Nublo rural park	26,000	3,510	13.50
Note: numbers in italics have been calculated based on the other two numbers in the row.

== Tenerife ==
In the evening of 18 August, a wildfire broke out in Vilaflor. A helicopter and three ground vehicles were used in the firefighting operation and, as of 19 August, the wildfire was said to be under control.

== Lanzarote ==
During the night of 18 August 2019, a forest fire broke out by the Bosquecillo (Spanish for 'small forest') area, located in the north of the island in the municipality of Haría. The fire was declared to be under control shortly after. The fire, which burnt through about 20,000 square metres (2.0 ha) of land, was eventually extinguished after over six hours.
