= 2019 Goseong fire =

Wildfire in South Korea

- Date: April 4, 2019 – April 6, 2019
- Location: Goseong County, South Korea

Statistics
- Burned area: 1,260 acres (5.1 km^{2})

Impacts
- Deaths: 2
- Injuries: 30
- Structures destroyed: Over 2,000
- Cost: $4.6 million USD

Ignition
- Cause: High-voltage power line

The 2019 Goseong fire was a fire in Goseong County, South Korea that lasted from 4 April to 6 April, 2019. It spread to the cities of Sokcho, Inje, Donghae and Gangneung and caused two deaths, more than 30 injuries, and the evacuation of more than 4,000 residents.

The cause of the fire was an extra high-voltage wire owned by KEPCO that fell due to high winds which led to an electric arc. On April 20, 2023 KEPCO was found to be liable for the fire and ordered to pay $6.6 million (USD) to evacuees. In January 2023, seven current and former KEPCO employees were acquitted of charges related to safety failures.

The fire damaged more than 200 homes and more than 2,000 buildings causing estimated damages of $4.6 million (USD). More than 13,000 firefighters were mobilized from other parts of the country to fight the fire. The captain of the South Korea national football team, Heung-Min Son donated $124,600 (USD) to victims of the fire

== See also ==
- 2019 Amazon rainforest wildfires
- 1971 Kure Wildfire
