= 2019 Vietnam forest fires =

Series of wildfires in Vietnam

- Date: 22 June – August 2019
- Location: City of Đà Nẵng, provinces of Hà Tĩnh, Nghệ An and Thừa Thiên-Huế in Vietnam

Statistics
- Burned area: More than 782 hectares of forests are damaged in three provinces: 500 hectares of forest (Đà Nẵng); 267 hectares of forest (Hà Tĩnh); 15 hectare of forest (Nghệ An)

Ignition
- Cause: Dry and hot weather seasons accompanied by several accidents: Caused by a fire started on top of a mountain (Đà Nẵng); Fire accidentally set by a Vietnamese resident (Hà Tĩnh); Caused by high temperatures and dry weather (Nghệ An); Caused by people offering incense and joss paper to deceased relatives in cemetery (Thừa Thiên-Huế)

Since June 22, 2019, fires have been reported in Nghệ An Province with several more occurring in the communes of Hương Trà and Hương Thủy in the central province of Thừa Thiên-Huế that have spread across over 100 hectares (247 acres) of pine and acacia trees. Other forest fires have been reported in Vietnamese central provinces and cities, from Đà Nẵng to Hà Tĩnh that has posed a threat to the 500kV transmission line in the area, forcing the Electricity of Vietnam (EVN) to cut electricity distribution.

== Effects ==
A fire occurred in Nghệ An Province on 22 June destroying 15 hectares (37 acres) of forest. On 28 June, five separate fires in Hà Tĩnh Province destroyed hundreds of hectares of forests and threatened nearby residential areas. The largest fire happened at around 1:00 pm at a protected forest area in Nghi Xuân District which quickly spread due to the sunny, dry weather and strong winds. Forest fires also struck the Hương Sơn District the following days with 20 places in the district experiencing fires. On 7 July, another fire occurred at around 1:00 pm on Thanh Vinh Mountain in Liên Chiểu District.

== Responses ==
Prime Minister Nguyễn Xuân Phúc urged the nation and local authorities to strengthen measures to prevent and contain the spread of the forest fires, detect fires and mobilise forces to extinguish fires before they spread. The Prime Minister also asked leaders of Bình Định, Đà Nẵng, Hà Tĩnh, Khánh Hòa, Nghệ An, Ninh Bình, Phú Yên, Quảng Bình, Quảng Nam, Quảng Ngãi, Quảng Trị, Thanh Hóa and Thừa Thiên-Huế provinces to implement urgent measures to prevent and fight forest fires. Furthermore, he urged the Vietnamese electricity board to co-operate with local authorities and related agencies to ensure the safety of the national electricity distribution system and be alert to any incidents that might affect power supply.

The local government in Thừa Thiên-Huế Province mobilised a team of 1,000 forest rangers, firefighters, policemen and soldiers together with reserve soldiers to contain the spread of the fires. Similar measures were instituted by other affected provinces. Deputy chairman of the Nghi Xuân District People's Committee announced that by 10.30am on 30 June, a forest fire in Xuân Hồng Commune of Hà Tĩnh Province was brought under control and officials continued to patrol the area.

== Aftermath ==
Most of the fires, including those in Nghệ An province, have been identified by the authorities as being caused by hot weather with the spread escalated by strong winds. The fire in Đà Nẵng started on the top of a mountain, and accompanied by strong winds and hot weather, was difficult for firefighters to access. It was brought under control in three hours on 7 July 2019. The cause of the fire was not specified and under investigation. One of the fires which occurred on 5 August in Thừa Thiên-Huế Province was caused by people offering incense and joss paper that were spread by strong winds to nearby vegetation consisting of pine trees with the authorities taking two hours to stop the fires before the fire started again at 7.30pm. The investigation on the fires in Hà Tĩnh was resolved with the arrest of a local Vietnamese man for accidentally causing the fire while burning rubbish in his home area located near the forest.

== See also ==
- Environmental issues in Vietnam
- 2019 Southeast Asian haze
