= 243 Command Fire =

2019 wildfire in Washington, United States

- Part of the 2019 Washington wildfires
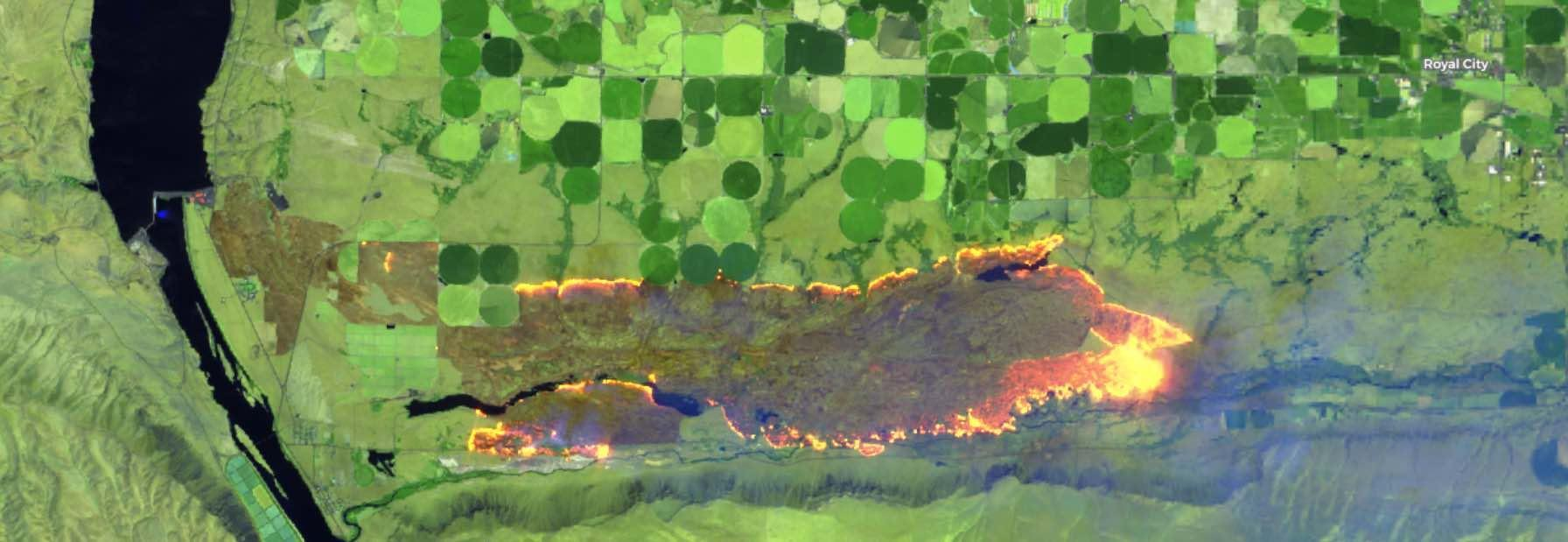
- Footprint of the 243 Command Fire
- Date: June 3, 2019 – June 7, 2019
- Location: near Wanapum Dam, Grant County, Washington, United States
- Coordinates: 46.869°N 119.898°W

Statistics
- Burned area: 20,380 acres (8,247 ha)

Ignition
- Cause: Under investigation

Map
- Location in Washington

The 243 Command Fire was a wildfire that burned near Wanapum Dam in Grant County, Washington, in the United States. The fire started on June 3, 2019, and was reported 85% contained as of June 10, 2019. The fire burned a total of 20,380 acres (8,247 ha) and the cause of the fire remains under investigation.

== Fire ==
The 243 Command Fire started on the evening of June 3, 2019, near Wanapum Dam and Highway 243. The fire moved east into Lower Crab Creek Canyon, growing to 9,000 acres (3,642 ha) within nine hours. Evacuation orders were put in place for approximately 25 homes near Smyrna. Fire crews contained the fire between the canyon's southern and northern ridges by creating a wide, cool outer ring, with no burnable material, to help contain the fire's footprints and remaining hot spots. Mop up and environmental rehab operations began on June 6 with the fire at 85% containment. It burned a total of 20,380 acres (8,247 ha).

== Impact ==
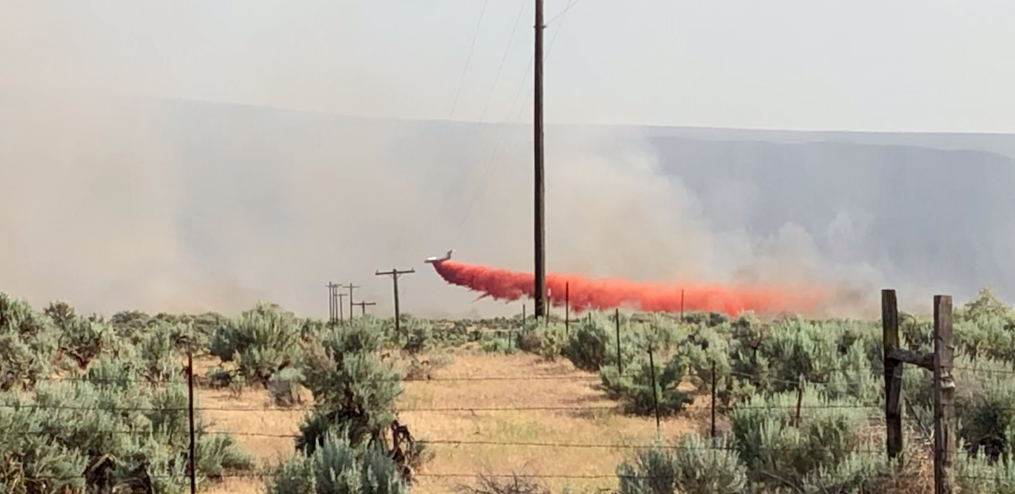
Air support helped fight the 243 Command Fire

Approximately 25 homes near Smyrna were placed under mandatory evacuation due to the fast growth of the fire. Power lines and local infrastructure suffered damaged as the result of the fire, including irrigation infrastructure on local farmland.
