= Apurinã language =

Arawakan language spoken in Brazil

Apurinã
- Ipurina
- Pupĩkaru Sãkire
- Native to: Brazil
- Region: Amazon basin
- Ethnicity: Popikariwakori (popũkare)
- Native speakers: 2,000 (2012)
- Language family: Arawakan: Southern; Piro; Apurinã

Official status
- Official language in: Brazil (Amazonas)

Language codes
- ISO 639-3: apu
- Glottolog: apur1254
- ELP: Apuriná
- Apurinã is classified as Definitely Endangered by the UNESCO Atlas of the World's Languages in Danger.

Apurinã, or Ipurina, is a Southern Maipurean language spoken by the Apurinã people of the Amazon basin. It has an active–stative syntax.

== Geographical distribution ==
Apurinã Indigenous communities are predominantly found along the Purus River, in the Northwestern Amazon region in Brazil, in the Amazonas state (Pickering 2009: 2). Its population is currently spread over twenty-seven different Indigenous lands along the Purus River (Apurinã PIB). with an estimated total population of 9,500 people. It is predicted, however, that fewer than 30% of the Apurinã population can speak the language fluently (Facundes 2000: 35). A definite number of speakers cannot be firmly determined because of the regional scattered presence of its people. The spread of Apurinã speakers to different regions was initially caused by conflict or disease, which has consequently led natives to lose the ability to speak the language for lack of practice and also because of interactions with other communities.

== Endangerment ==
As a consequence of violence and oppression towards Indigenous people, some natives and descendants choose to not identify themselves as Indigenous, further reducing the number of people categorized as speaking the language (Facundes 2000: 23). The low transmission and cultivation of the language result in the risk of endangerment. The endangerment level of Apurinã is currently at level 3 (Facundes 2000: 4), which means that although adults still speak the language, children are no longer being exposed to it. Because they are taught Portuguese or Spanish instead, a further reduction in the number of people that speak the language could occur over the years, eventually leading it to become extinct.

== Phonology ==
=== Vowels ===
Apurinã vowels are nasalized by surrounding nasal vowels, even across word boundaries.

	Short						Long					
	Front		Central		Back		Front		Central		Back	
	Oral	Nasal	Oral	Nasal	Oral	Nasal	Oral	Nasal	Oral	Nasal	Oral	Nasal
High	i	ĩ	ɨ	ɨ̃			iː	ĩː	ɨː	ɨ̃ː		
Mid	e	ẽ			o	õ	eː	ẽː			oː	õː
Low			a	ã					aː	ãː		

- /e/ can be lowered to [ɛ] when preceding an oral syllable.
- /o/ can be freely realized as [ʊ, u] within various syllable positions.

=== Consonants ===
	Bilabial	Alveolar	Postalveolar/palatal	Velar	Glottal
Nasal	m	n	ɲ		
Plosive	p	t		k	
Affricate		t͡s	t͡ʃ		
Fricative		s	ʃ		h
Flap		ɾ			
Approximant			j	ɰ	

== Morphology ==
Facundes' dissertation (2000) explores the morphology of Apurinã. He starts off by introducing the domain of morphology, followed by constructors of a word and makes reference to morphemes, allomorphs, bound and free formatives. Facundes' (2000) introduction to morphology is followed by a detailed account of noun morphology where he describes simple, compound, and deverbal nouns. In simple nouns, Facundes (2000) refers to underived, simple nouns. They have only one root and cannot be further simplified. Anãpa for 'dog' is one of his examples (2000: 151).

Morphemes are one of the constructors explored by Facundes (2000). Morphemes are grammatical fragments that are put together to generate one final product, often a word. It is the minimal unit of word-building in a language and so cannot be broken down any further (Facundes 2000: 19). For example, the word "unbreakable" has of three morphemes: un, break and able. 'Un' is a prefix preceding the base morpheme, break. Finally, 'able' is a suffix, a morpheme following the base morpheme. Although the combination of multiple morphemes yields a word with a meaning, individual morphemes do not always have a recognizable meaning. For example, the word "touched" can be broken down into two morphemes, "touch", a base morpheme and "ed", an affix for the morpheme base. Within morphemes and word-structure, Facundes (2000: 122) mentions that although the meaning of word is not always transparent, there are two separate classes in Apurinã. The phonological word allows pauses to occur at the two boundaries of another word.

nu-su-pe-ka-ko nota watxa
1SG-go-PFV-PRED-FUT 1SG today
"I'll get going now"

The example is a representation of a phonological word in which a 'pause phenomenon' can be manifested in a way that would shift the order in which the word appears in the sentence without affecting the general interpretation of the sentence (Facundes 2000: 122)

Grammatical words have little or ambiguous lexical meaning but represent a grammatical relationship with other words in the same sentence.

kuku-wako-ru
man-PL-M
"men"

*uwa muteka-wako-ru
3M run-PL-M
"They ran"

nu-su-pe-ka-ko nota watxa
1SG-go-PFV-PRED-FUT 1SG today
"I'll get going now"

As presented by Facundes (2000: 125), each of the sentences above contain a plural marker wako-ru, which is used exclusively with nouns. Furthermore, the grammatical words can often be placed between two words as seen in the example below. In it, two grammatical words uwa and muteka-nanu-ta are placed on either side of owa-kata "with her." The meaning of the sentence is thus "He was running with her."

uwa owa-kata muteka-nanu-ta
3SG.M 3SG.F-ASSOC run-PROG-VBLZ
"He was running with her"

Affixes are also used in morphology and are added before or after a base morpheme. They are a type of bound formative encoding a grammatical constructor associated with a specific word class. The position in which the affix is placed in a word changes its classification to either a prefix, which is before the base morpheme, or a suffix, which is after the base morpheme. In example 4a provided by Facundes (2000: 137), wako-ru is a plural suffix and is after the base morpheme kuku, 'man'. The use of the suffix makes the base morpheme, kuku, plural. It thus becomes kuku-wako-ru 'men' (2000: 124). Facundes (2000) describes other forms of bound formatives. They are categorized separately from prefixes and suffixes and so also function differently. In the example provided by Facundes (2000), some bound formatives float in a sentence but maintain a general meaning.

nota muteka-ko
1SG run-FUT
"I'll run away"

nota-ko muteka
1SG-FUT run
"I'll run away"

As seen in the examples above, the marker -ko is used in both sentences 1a and 1b and yields sentences with the same meaning.

=== Valency ===
Valency-reducing operations change a transitive sentence into an intransitive sentence by altering the function of a subject into an oblique status. They are no longer considered core arguments. Oblique arguments are also known to occupy a "patient" role and play no critical role in the sentence, compared to arguments possessing an "agent" semantic role. An oblique argument may be omitted in the sentence, and the sentence still withholds no information. Passive constructions, as described by Facundes (2000: 400), are indicated by the passive parker –ka after a base morpheme. The passive marker encodes a patient role in the sentence (Facundes 2000: 400).

ø-oka-pẽ-ka
3M-kill-PFV-PASS
He was killed

Example (2a) above shows the effect of the subject/possessor marker. The example above, as presented by Facundes (2000: 401), occurs in a naturally occurring speech and thus can often also be combined with other markers. Facundes (2000) mentions combining the valency-reducing passive marker –ka with the perfective marker –pe and sometimes the imperfective marker –panhi, and all sentences with that construction would still retain a passive tone.

uwã u-su-pẽ-ka
there 3M-go-PFV-PASS
He/It has gone (somewhere)

The above examples are provided by Facundes (2000: 401) to show the relationship between the passive marker and combined with perfective or imperfective markers. Example 2b shows the combination of the perfective marker –pe with the passive marker -ka. Then, "gone" remains as the past participle, which notes the perfect and passive tenses. As described by Facundes (2000: 401), the argument would remain passive.

=== Tense ===
==== Future ====
Like in other languages, tense notes the progression on an action or an event through time. In Apurinã, tense is classified as future or non future. The two types of tense refer to the speech locus, the time during which the speech is taking place (Facundes 2000: 513).

The future indicates a speech or an action in a not-immediate future. It is identified with the use of the marker morpheme –ko (Facundes 2000: 513) and can be attached to noun bases, pronoun bases, numeral bases and particle bases.

nota-ko suka-ru
1SG-FUT give-3M.O
I'll give away to him

In the above example, the future is signified by the attaching of the morpheme -ko to the pronoun nota, the first-person singular, "I".

kona-ko nhi-txiparu-te nhi-suka-i
not-FUT 1SG-banana-POSSD 1SG-give-2.O
I won't give you banana

In the above example, the same rule applies when the future is on its negative form, with a negative particle. 'I will not' is symbolised by the attaching of the morpheme –ko to a 'not' proposition, giving the sentence an overall future meaning (Facundes 2000: 410).

==== Non-future ====
The non-future tense is used for events prior to the speech locus, which is known as the past in most languages. Apurinã has only two tenses, and the current speech locus, also known as the present, can also be categorised as non-future. That rule is also applicable to any timeframe happening immediately after the speech locus, as it is considered to be the immediate future. No specific morpheme marks the non-future tense.

akirita i-txa-ro owa
call 3M-AUX-3F.O 3SG.F
He called her

The former example is a sentence describing an event that happened in the past and so is not marked by a particular morpheme to indicate a past action.

Mipa imata-ru a-sãkire
Mipa know-3M.O 1PL-language
Mipa knows our language

The latter example is also considered to be non-tense and indicates a present timeframe. Again, there is no specific marker morpheme indicating the timeframe. Thus, whenever no –ko morpheme is included for a noun or pronoun base, the event can be assumed to have taken place in the past, the present, or the near future.

As mentioned by Facundes (2000: 515), the difference between the future and the immediate future in the language cannot be measured exactly. That is because speakers can vary as to how much they mark an event as future or immediate future. The example provided by Facundes (2000: 515), consisted of a timeframe exceeding the speech locus by only a couple of days. He described that then, the tense use will depend on the speaker but most often be presented as a distant future, rather than the immediate future.

=== Pronouns ===
Facundes' dissertation (2000) refers to the use of independent pronouns in the Apurina language. They encode gender, person, or number or often a combination of all three and can stand alone or follow a verb or proposition. As the table below shows, there are four singular independent pronouns and three plural independent pronouns. As the examples demonstrate, pronouns can be used in a sentence for both the subject and the object (2000: 345).

Pronoun forms
		singular	plural
1st person		nota	ata
2nd person		pite	hĩte
3rd person	masc.	uwa	unawa
3rd person	fem.	owa	unawa

nhi-nhipoko-ta nota
1SG-eat-VBLZ 1SG
"I did eating"

pi-nhipoko-ta pita
2SG-eat-VBLZ 2SG
"You did eating"

o-nhipoko-ta owa
3SG.F-eat-VBLZ 3SG.F
"She did eating"

In the above examples, Facundes (2000) demonstrates the use of pronouns 'nhi' 'pi', 'o', as shown in the example to start the verb nhipoko-ta.

=== Causatives ===
Causative sentences have the suffix –ka, as described by Facundes (2000: 310), and can be used with both transitive and intransitive verbs. The examples below show the use of the causative marker being used in both transitive and intransitive verbs.

nhi-nhipoko-ka_{1}-ka_{2}-ta-ru (M)
1SG-eat-INTENS-CAUS-VBLZ-3M.O {}
"I made him do eating"

nhi-nhika-nanu-ka_{2}-ta-ru yapa
1SG-eat-PROG-CAUS-VBLZ-3M.O capybara
"I am making him eat capybara"

The causative morpheme –ka_{2} has the same function in both transitive and intransitive verbs. The difference is the position in the sentence. The change in position depends on whether the verb is a class_{1} verb or a class_{2} verb. In brief, class_{1} verbs have bound formatives attaching to the base_{0} to form base_{1}, thus making base_{1} a combination between base_{0} and the bound class_{1} formative (Facundes 2000: 308). Subsequently, class_{2} verbs attach to base_{1} to form base_{2}. Class_{2} verbs however, differ from class_{1} in that the verbalizer marker –ta is not necessary.

In class_{1} formatives, the verb is followed by the dependent verbalizer marker –ta, as seen in the above examples. In class_{2}, the causative marker is –ka_{3} and does not have a dependent relationship with the base verb (Facundes 2000: 325). The formative marker –ka_{3} is classified as a class_{2} verb, but –ka_{2} belongs in to class_{1}. Examples are provided by Facundes (2000: 507) for the location of –ka_{2} and –ka_{3} as a causative marker.

amarunu n-umaka-ka_{2}-nanu-ta
boy 1SG-sleep-CAUS-PROG-VBLZ
"I am making the kid sleep"

nhi-nhika-ka_{3}-ru yapa
1SG-eat-CAUS-3M.O capybara
"I made him eat capybara"

In the first example, amarunu is the causee, and n is the causer. By adding a causative marker, the monovalent verb becomes bivalent. Similarly, in the example below, nhi is the causer, and ru is the causee, which causes a bivalent verb to become a trivalent verb.
