= Liên Chiểu district =

Coordinates: 16°07′26″N 108°07′04″E

Liên Chiểu district Quận Liên Chiểu
- Urban district
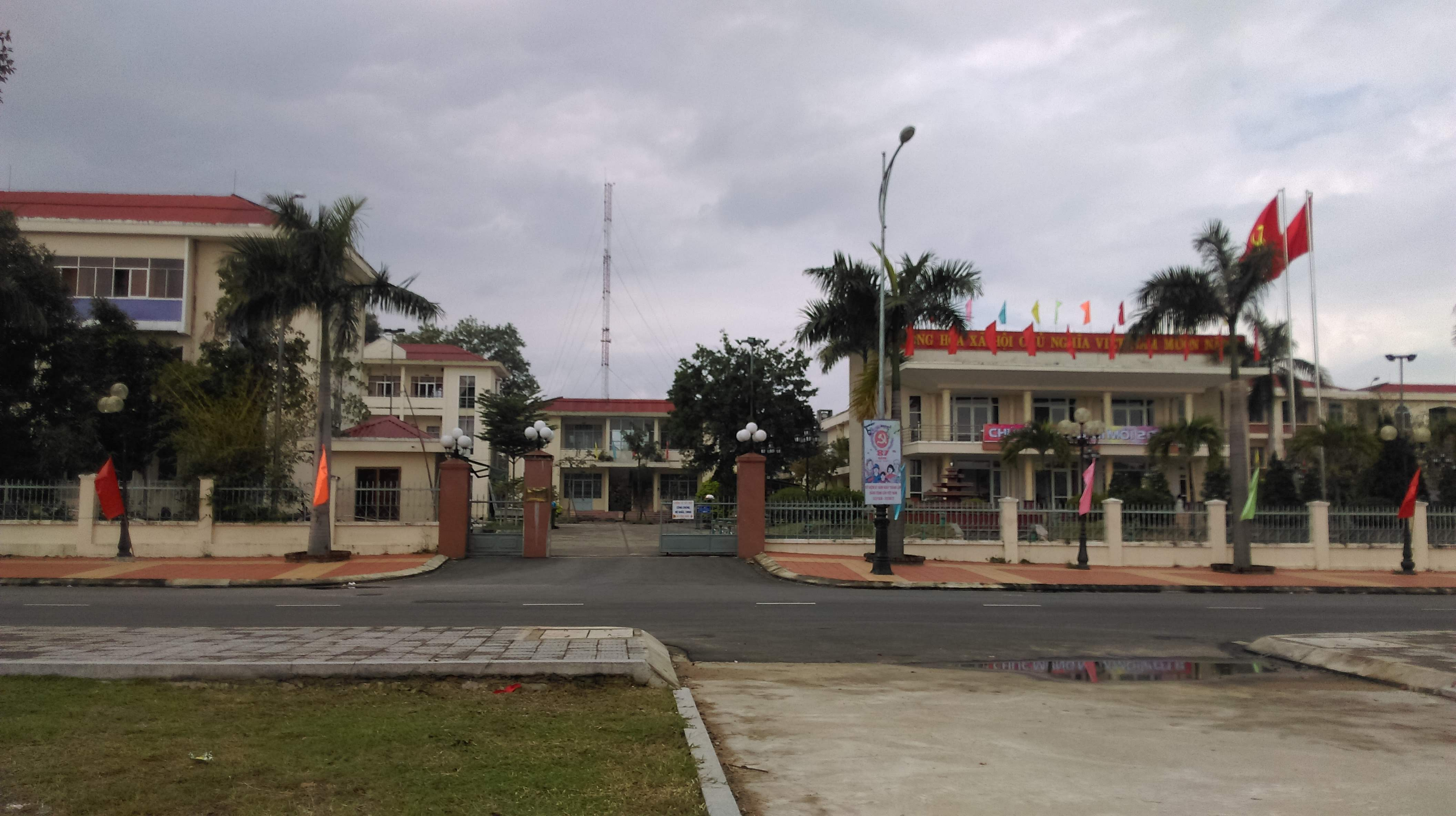
- Lien Chieu District Administrative Center

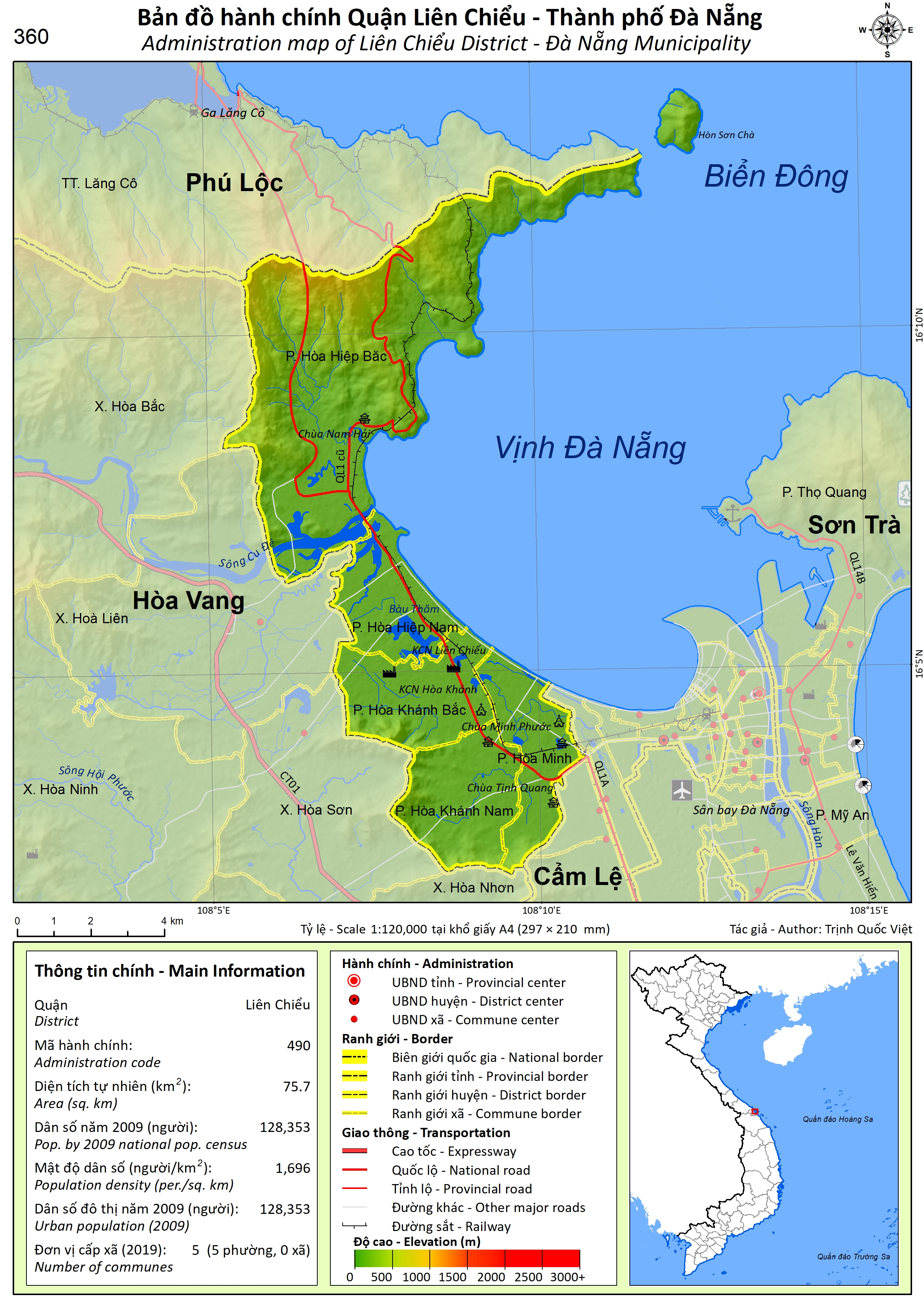
- Administration map of the district in Da Nang
- Country: Vietnam
- Region: South Central Coast
- Municipality: Da Nang
- Capital: Da Nang

Area
  - Total: 29 sq mi (76 km^{2})

Population (2018)
  - Total: 170,153
- Time zone: UTC+7 (Indochina Time)

Liên Chiểu was a former urban district of Da Nang in the South Central Coast region of Vietnam. As of 2003 the district had a population of 71,818. The district covers an area of 76 km^{2} (29 sq mi). The district capital lies at Hòa Minh ward.

The district is divided into five wards (phường):

- Hòa Hiệp Bắc
- Hòa Hiệp Nam
- Hòa Khánh Bắc
- Hòa Khánh Nam
- Hòa Minh
