= Risco Caído =

Risco Caido and the Sacred Mountains of Gran Canaria Cultural Landscape
UNESCO World Heritage Site
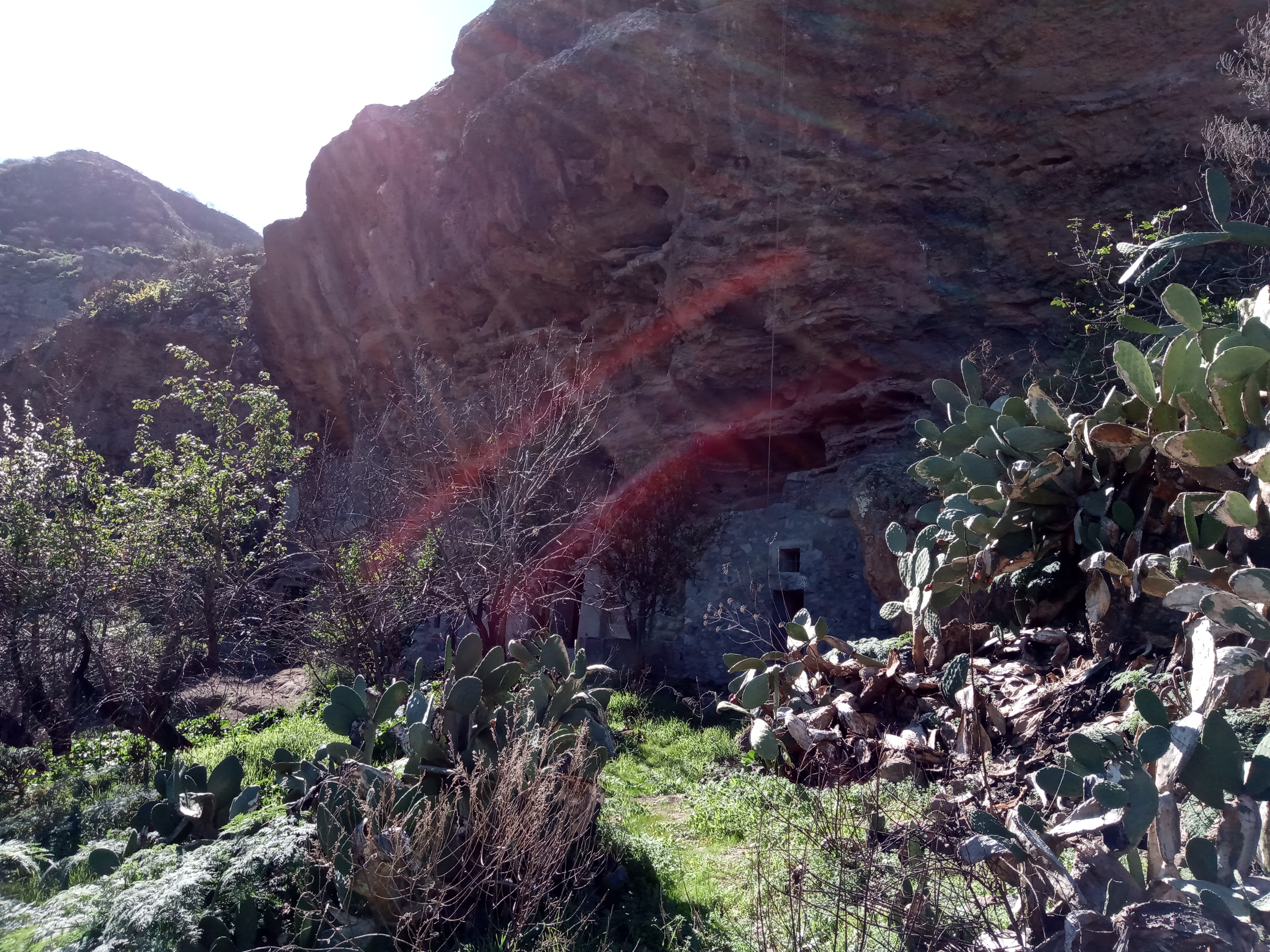

- Location within Canary Islands
- Location: Gran Canaria, Canary Islands, Spain
- Criteria: (iii)(v)
- Reference: 1578
- Inscription: 2019 (43rd Session)
- Area: 9,425 ha (23,290 acres)
- Buffer zone: 8,557 ha (21,140 acres)
- Website: riscocaido.grancanaria.com
- Coordinates: 28.0435°N 15.6613°W

Risco Caído is a land-form and archaeological site on the island of Gran Canaria, Spain. The site contains prehistoric cave dwellings, temples, and granaries attributed to the pre-Hispanic culture of the Canary Islands. It is also considered to have been used as an astronomical observatory by Aboriginal people. In July 2019, Risco Caído was named as a UNESCO World Heritage Site. It is also a UNESCO recognised Cultural Landscape. It is the first World Heritage Site of the island of Gran Canaria and the province of Las Palmas and the fourth of the Canary Islands.

== Description ==
Located in a vast mountainous area in the centre of Gran Canaria, Risco Caído comprises cliffs, ravines and volcanic formations in a landscape of rich biodiversity. The landscape includes a large number of troglodyte (cave-dwelling) habitats, granaries and cisterns whose age is proof of the presence of a pre-Hispanic culture on the island, which evolved in isolation from the arrival of North African Berbers, around the beginning of our era, until the first Spanish settlers in the 15th century. The troglodyte complex also includes cult cavities and two sacred temples or almogarenes, Risco Caído and Roque Bentayga, where seasonal ceremonies were held. These temples are thought to be linked to a possible cult of the stars and Mother Earth.

== Critics ==
The inclusion of Risco Caído in the list of UNESCO World Heritage Sites has been criticized by scholars such as the mathematician José Barrios, who considers that there is little scientific reason to consider it an aboriginal astronomical observatory or to support the institutional overprotection of this enclave over others in Gran Canaria, such as the archaeological site of Four Doors. The geographer Eustaquio Villalba has also called into question the existence of an astronomical observatory in Risco Caído. Both criticise the fact that a single article (which they consider to have "little scientific basis"), written by the discoverer of the site, Julio Cuenca, has sufficed for world heritage status.

According to Barrios, there is no scientific study that supports the archaeological astronomical hypothesis (the fundamental reason why the site was declared a World Heritage Site). He claims that there are no astronomical markers that would verify this theory and that there is not a single published technical report that supports it.
