= 2019 Washington wildfires =

Wildfire season in Washington, United States

- Date: March–October 2019

The 2019 Washington wildfire season officially began in March 2019.

== Background ==
While the typical "fire season" in Washington varies every year based on weather conditions, most wildfires occur in between July and October. However, hotter, drier conditions can allow wildfires to start outside of these boundaries. Wildfires tend to start at these times of the year after moisture from winter and spring precipitation dries up. Vegetation and overall conditions are the hottest and driest in these periods. The increase of vegetation can make the fires spread easier.

== Government preparation ==
In January 2019, the Washington Commissioner of Public Lands Hilary Franz proposed a $55 million, 10-year plan to combat fires that included greatly expanded budgeting for 30 new full-time and 40 seasonal firefighters, new training academies, new firefighting equipment including aircraft, and a new "rangeland" firefighting plan for the state.

== Environment ==
Drought conditions existed in over half of Washington counties in May 2019. Many water basins were at half their median snowpack level, and the state overall was at its fourth lowest level in 30 years according to the Washington State Department of Ecology.

== Fires and smoke ==
There were 24 Western Washington wildfires reported before the spring equinox, including a 18-acre (7.3 ha) blaze near Mount St. Helens that heavily damaged one structure.

The 243 Command Fire was the first large fire of the season. It began on June 3 near Wanapum Dam on the Columbia River in Eastern Washington, and by June 5 had grown to 5,000 acres (2,000 ha), causing mandatory evacuations near Beverly, and made Spokane's air quality the worst in the United States.

== See also ==
- List of Washington wildfires
