= Apurinã =

Popũkare

Total population
- 9,487 (2014)

Regions with significant populations
- Brazil (Amazonas, Mato Grosso, Rondônia)

Languages
- Apurinã

Religion
- Traditional tribal religion

Related ethnic groups
- Kaxarari

The Apurinã, also called the Ipurinã, Ipurinãn, Kangite, Popukare (endonym), are an Indigenous people who live near the Purus River in western Brazil and speak Apurinã.

Their houses are long, low and narrow: the side walls and roof are one, poles being fixed in the ground and then bent together so as to meet and form a pointed arch for the cross-sections. They use small bark canoes. Their chief weapons are poisoned arrows. They have a native god called Guintiniri.
