= Agriculture in Indonesia =

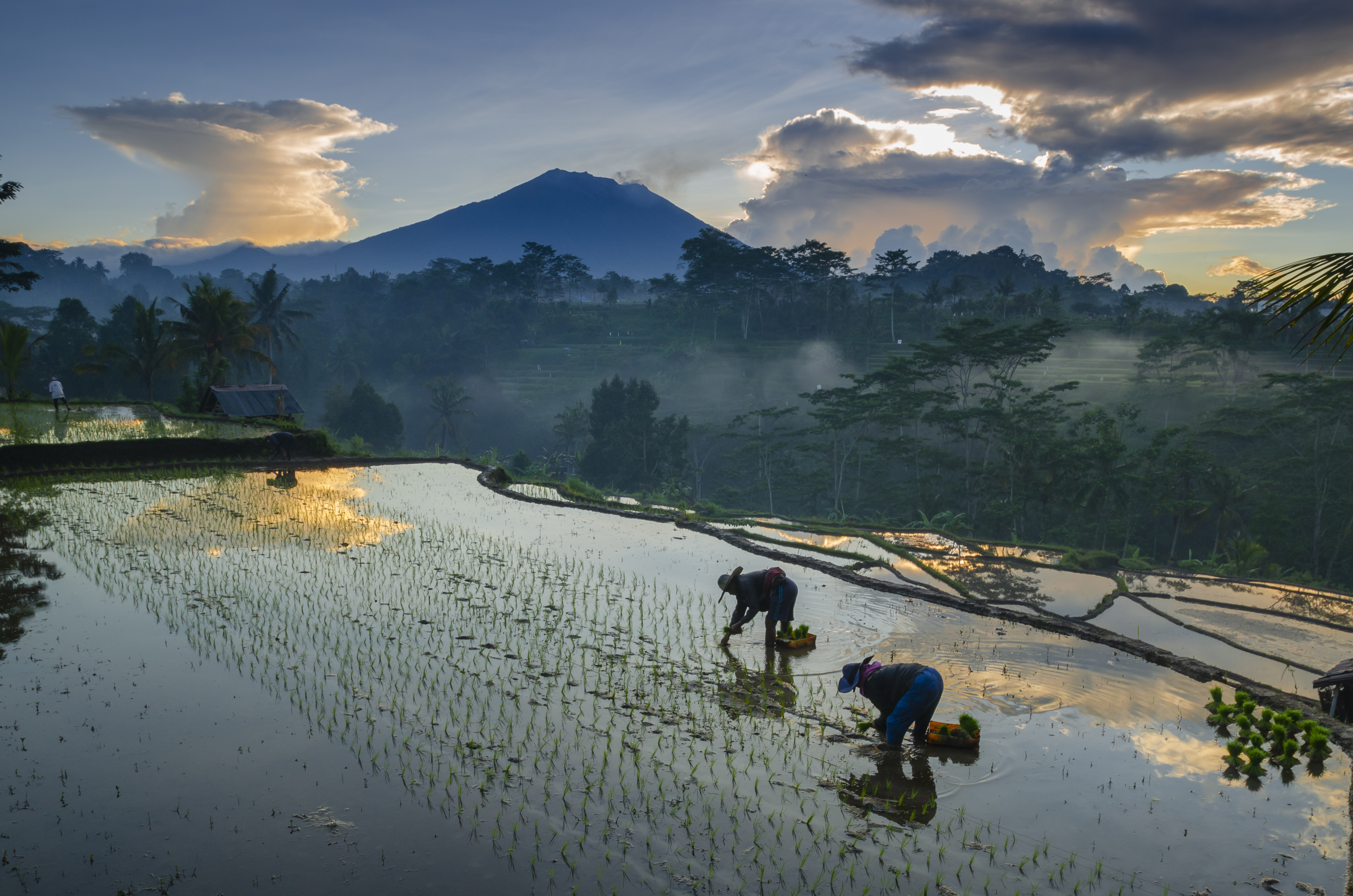
Rice cultivation in Bangli Regency, Bali

Agriculture in Indonesia is one of the key sectors within the Indonesian economy. In the last 50 years, the sector's share in national gross domestic product has decreased considerably, due to the rise of industrialisation and service sector. Nevertheless, for the majority of Indonesian households, farming and plantation remain as a vital income generator. In 2013, the agricultural sector contributed 14.43% to national GDP, a slight decline from 2003's contribution which was 15.19%. In 2012, the agricultural sector provided jobs to approximately 49 million Indonesians, representing 41% of the country's total labor force.

Currently, approximately 30% of Indonesia's land area is used for agriculture. Indonesian agriculture sector is supervised and regulated by the Indonesian Ministry of Agriculture.

The agricultural sector of Indonesia consists of:

- Large plantations, either owned by state or private companies;
- Smallholder production modes, mostly family owned and run by traditional agricultural households.

Industrial scale export commodities such as palm oil and rubber, are mainly supplied by large plantations, while the small scale farmers focus on horticultural commodities such as rice, corn, soybeans, mango, fruits and vegetables in order to meet the food consumption of the local and regional population. At present, Indonesia is also the world's largest producer of palm oil, cloves, and cinnamon, the 2nd largest producer of nutmeg natural rubber cassava vanilla and coconut oil, the 3rd largest producer of rice and cocoa, the 4th largest producer of coffee. the 5th largest tobacco producer. and the 6th largest producer of tea.

Large scale export of crops like palm oil, biomass and rubber has led to a number of environmental conflicts as large scale production both displaces smallholders and causes environmental degradation through deforestation. Forestry and energy crops have increased in recent years as global demand for bioenergy, through an increase in pellet fuel and wood chips for export.

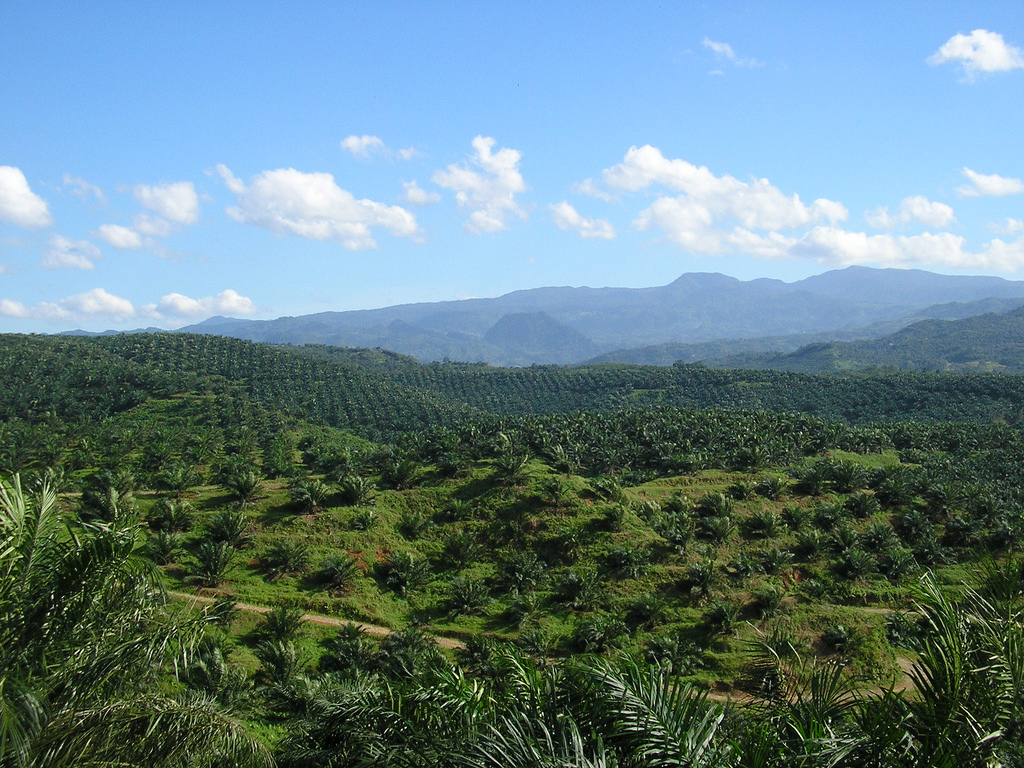
Vast palm oil plantation in Indonesia. Currently, Indonesia is the world's largest producer of palm oil.

== History ==
In Indonesian history, agricultural pursuits spanned for some millennia with some traces still observable in some parts of the archipelago. The hunter-gatherer society still exist in interior Kalimantan (Indonesian Borneo) and Papua (Indonesian New Guinea) such as the Kombai people, while they were a sophisticated rice-cultivating community, the remnants of Hindu-Buddhist polity can still be observed in Bali through their subak irrigation system.

=== Ancient era ===
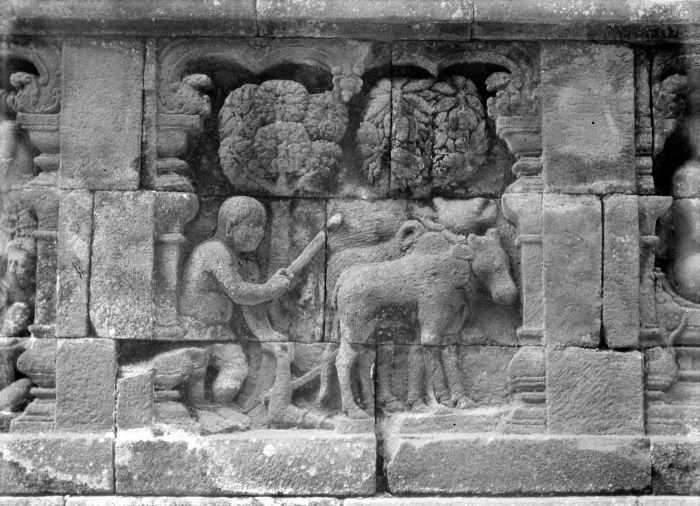
The bas-relief in 8th century Borobudur depicting a farmer plowing the field pulled by a buffalo.

Agriculture in Indonesia started as a means to grow and provide food. Rice, coconut, sugar palm, taro, tubers, shallots and tropical fruits were among the earliest produce being cultivated in the archipelago. Evidence of wild rice cultivation on the island of Sulawesi dates back from 3000 BCE. Rice has been a staple food for Indonesians for a millennium and holds a central place in Indonesian culture and cuisine.

The importance of rice in Indonesian culture is demonstrated through the reverence of Dewi Sri, the rice goddess of ancient Java and Bali. Traditionally, the agricultural cycles linked to rice cultivation were celebrated through rituals, such as Sundanese Seren Taun or the "rice harvest festival." In Bali, the traditional subak irrigation system was created to ensure that there is adequate water supply for rice paddies. The irrigation system was managed by priests and created around "water temples". Indonesian vernacular architecture also recognizes numbers of lumbung or rice barns styles, such as Sundanese leuit, Sasak style rice barn, Toraja's tongkonan shape, to Minangkabau's rangkiang. Rice-growing shapes the landscape, is sold at markets, and is served in most meals.

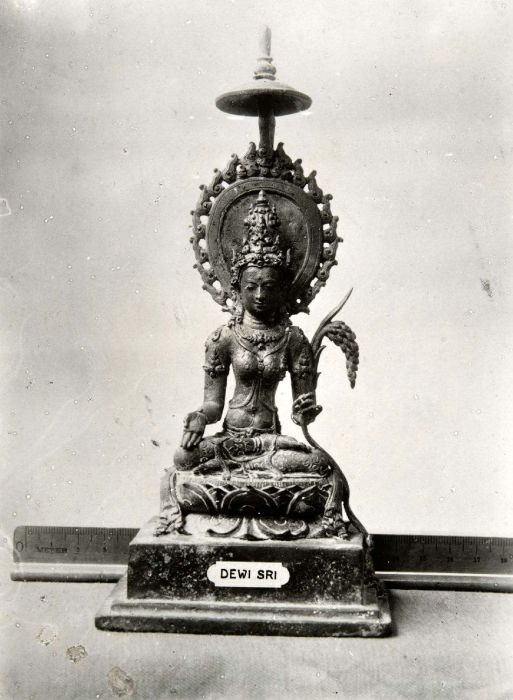
Ancient statue of the rice goddess Dewi Sri.

While some panels of the bas-reliefs on temple walls, such as Borobudur and Prambanan, describe agricultural activities, Javanese stone inscriptions which can be traced back from the 8th century, describes the king placing a levy on rice. Next to rice, the bas-reliefs of Borobudur describe other indigenous agricultural products as well, like banana (musa paradisiaca), coconut (Cocos nucifera), sugarcane (Saccharum officinarum'), Java apple (Syzygium samarangense), jackfruit (Artocarpus heterophyllus), durian (Durio zibethinus) and mangosteen (Mangifera indica).

Local kingdoms in Indonesia were among the earliest polities to participate in global spice trade. The ancient maritime empires of Srivijaya (7th to 11th century) and Majapahit (13th to 15th century) for example, were actively involved in spice trade with China, India and the Middle East. Ports of Sunda and Banten were important centers of pepper trade back in the 14th to 17th centuries.

=== Colonial era ===
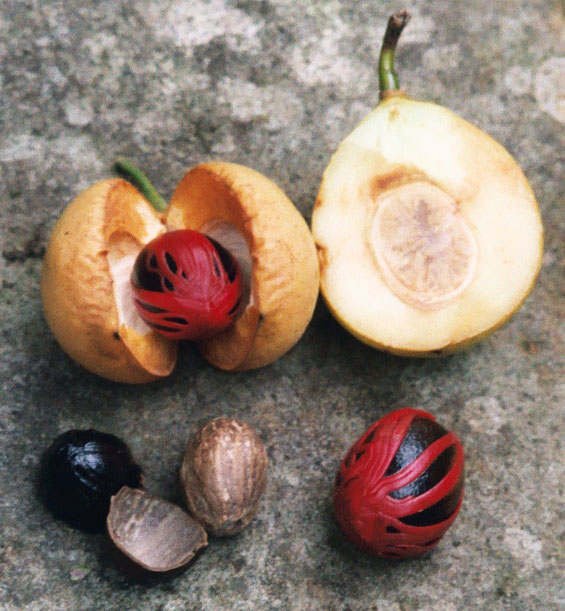
Nutmeg, for a long time was endemic only in Banda Islands.

Certain endemic Indonesian spices such as nutmeg which is indigenous to the Banda Islands and cloves were highly sought in the West, and prompted the European Age of Exploration. The Portuguese were the earliest Europeans who established their presence in the archipelago by the early 16th century. The Portuguese, through Spanish intermediaries, introduced the New World's products such as chili pepper, maize, papaya, peanuts, potato, tomato, rubber and tobacco into the archipelago's soil.

The surge of the global spice trade was what led European traders reach the Indonesian archipelago who were in search for direct sources of valuable spices, at the same time, cut through middlemen in Asia (Arabs and Indian merchants) and in Europe (Italian merchants). By the early 17th century, Dutch East India Company (VOC) began to establish its influence within the archipelago, by building trading offices, warehouses and forts in Amboina and Batavia. By then, VOC monopolized the spice commodity trade, especially pepper and nutmeg, and actively pursued its shares in intra-Asian trades with India and China. VOC further established sugar plantations in Java.

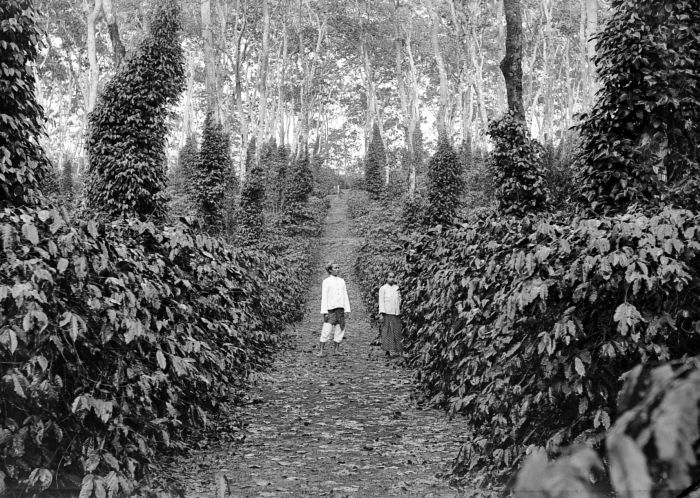
Coffee plantation in Java, in early 20th century Dutch East Indies.

By the turn of the 19th century, VOC was declared bankrupt and was nationalized by the Dutch as Dutch East Indies. This event officially marked the Dutch colonial period in the archipelago. In the mid-19th century, the Dutch East Indies government implemented cultuurstelsel which required a portion of agricultural production lands to be devoted to export crops. The cultivation system was enforced in Java and other parts of Indonesia by the Dutch colonial government between 1830 and 1870. Indonesian historians refer to it as Tanam Paksa ("Enforcement Planting"). The Dutch introduced numbers of cash crops and commodities to create and establish an economic engine in its colony. Establishment of sugarcane, coffee, tea, tobacco, quinine, rubber and palm oil plantations was also expanded in the colony.

During the Dutch East Indies era, the agriculture sector was regulated by the Departement van Landbouw (1905), Departement van Landbouw, Nijverheid en Handel (1911) and Departement van Ekonomische Zaken (1934).

=== Republic era ===
In 1942, Dutch East Indies fell under the control of the Japanese Empire. During the Japanese occupation, the agriculture sector was overseen by the Gunseikanbu Sangyobu. During World War II (1942–1945), the Indies experienced hardships which included agricultural scarcity and famine. Rice yields and plantation commodities were controlled by the Japanese empire's military authority. The plantation business which was a major economic sector, was relatively shut down during the Pacific War and the ensuing Indonesian War of Independence (1945–1949). All efforts in the agricultural sector was focused in meeting basic needs for food (rice) and clothing (cotton). The Imperial Japanese authority attempted to increase rice and cotton production in the occupied Indies by mobilizing labor. However, scarcity of these essential commodities prevailed and resulted to famine and clothing shortage.

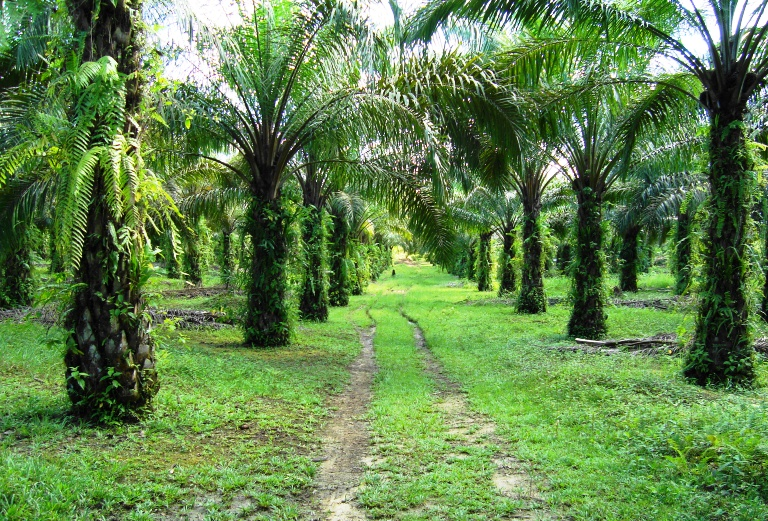
Palm oil plantation in Kampar Regency, Riau.

The Indonesian Republic declared its independence on 17 August 1945. Indonesia became a member of United Nations' Food and Agriculture Organization (FAO) in 1948. The partnership was strengthened with the opening of a FAO country office in 1978. The agriculture sector of the republic has been supervised and regulated by the Indonesian Ministry of Agriculture. The Indonesian Republic also nationalized many of its colonial economic infrastructures, institutions and businesses and inherited the agricultural system of its predecessor, the Dutch East Indies.

In the 1960s until the 1980s, the republic made every effort to develop a post-war agricultural sector and led to the sector's significant expansion. During the Suharto era, the government launched the transmigration program that relocated landless farmers from the overpopulated Java to the less populated Sumatra, Kalimantan, Sulawesi and Papua, thus expanded agricultural farms in the outer islands of the territory.

The most significant indicator of growth is the expansion of palm oil plantations, which became the new form of transmigration program. Currently, Indonesia is the world's largest producer of palm oil and the leading producer of coffee, rubber and cocoa. However, Indonesia still has vast tracts of idle lands which can potentially be developed into farmlands. These cover 40 million hectares of degraded forest areas that have turned into grasslands after being abandoned by logging concessionaires.

Agricultural commodities are known for its economic resilience and are among the first to recover from the impacts of global financial meltdown. With a large number of its population still working in the agriculture segment, Indonesia has great potentials of attracting foreign investments.

== Production ==
Indonesia produced in 2025:

- 250 million tons of palm oil (largest producer in the world);
- 71.95 million tons of rice (4th largest producer in the world);
- 16.16 million tons of maize (12th largest producer in the world);
- 39.07 million tons of sugar cane (9th largest producer in the world);
- 17.5 million tons of coconut (largest producer in the world);
- 17.2 million tons of cassava (6th largest producer in the world);
- 9.82 million tons of banana (3rd largest producer in the world);
- 2.04 million tons of natural rubber (2nd largest producer in the world, just behind Thailand);
- 3.20 million tons of pineapple (largest producer in the world);
- 4.13 million tons of mango (including mangosteen and guava) (4th largest producer in the world, only behind India, China and Thailand);
- 3.08 million tons of chili pepper (4th largest producer in the world, behind China, Mexico and Turkey);
- 2.5 million tons of orange (8th largest producer in the world);
- 2.18 million tons of onion (4th largest producer in the world);
- 1.45 million tons of sweet potato (7th largest producer in the world);
- 1.4 million tons of cabbage;
- 1.23 million tons of tomatoes;
- 1.2 million tonnes of potato;
- 1.1 million tons of papaya (5th largest producer in the world, only behind India, Brazil, Mexico and Dominican Republic);
- 722 thousand tons of coffee (3rd largest producer in the world, behind Brazil and Vietnam);
- 760 thousand tons of avocado (4th largest producer in the world, only behind Mexico, Dominican Republic and Peru);
- 410 thousand tons of beans;
- 350 thousand tons of soy;
- 280 thousand tons of cocoa;

In addition to smaller productions of other agricultural products, such as leeks (610 thousand tons), eggplant (680 thousand tons), cucumber (470 thousand tons), ginger (169 thousand tons), cashew nuts (110 thousand tons, 10th largest producer in the world), cloves (135 thousand tons), areca nut (142 thousand tonnes), kapok fruit (26 thousand tons), tea (124 thousand tons), tobacco (256 thousand tons, 5th largest producer in the world) etc.

== Food products ==
The agriculture sector plays a vital role in food production and food security and in supplying the needs of a huge Indonesian population.

=== Seafood ===
In 2015, the total production of seafood reached about 22.31 million metric tons, valued at around 18.10 billion US dollars. For capture of wild fish (both inland and marine), the production trend was steady in 2011–2015, while there was a steep increase in the production from aquaculture during the same period.

=== Rice ===
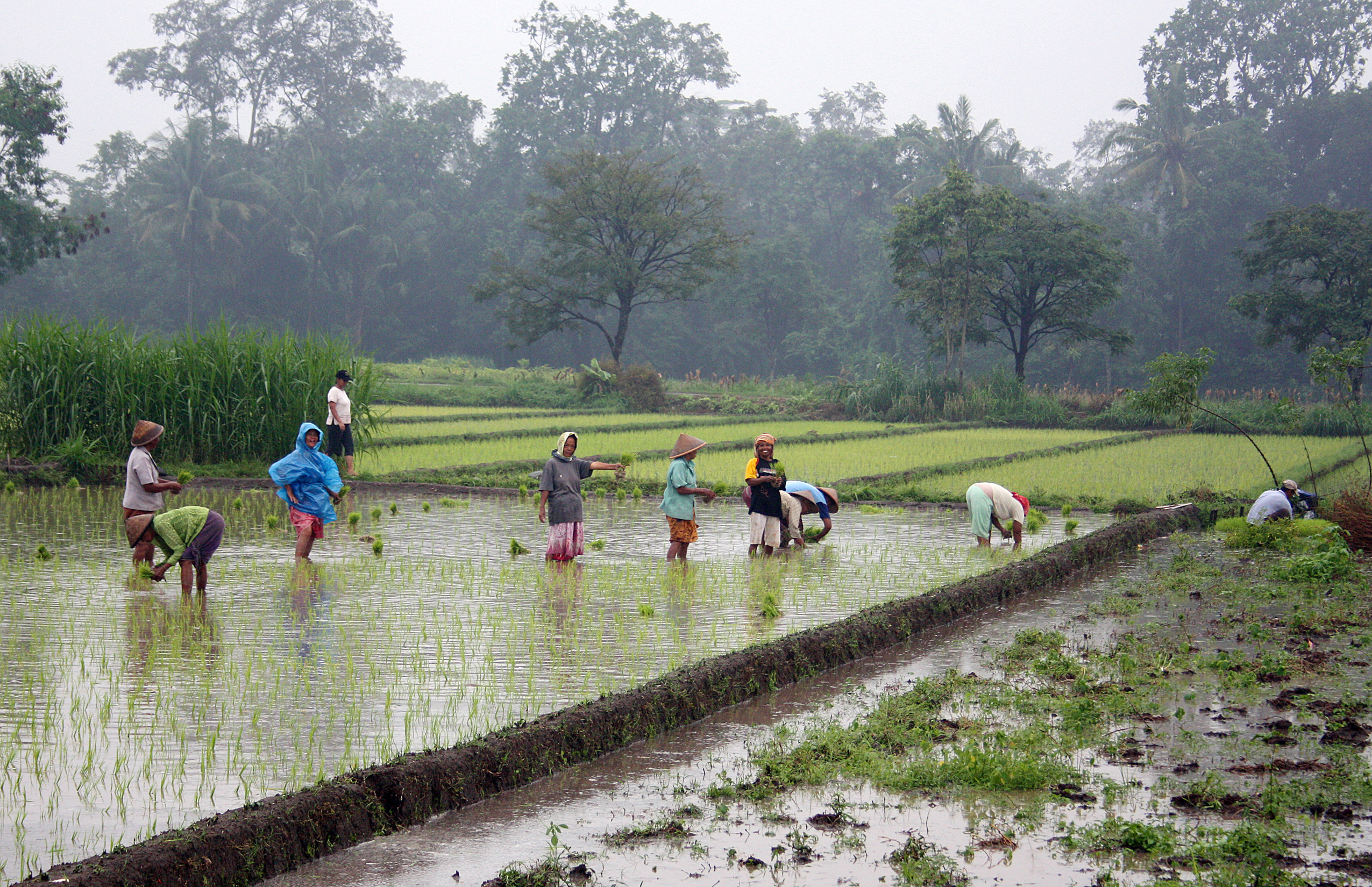
Javanese women planting rice in a ricefield near Prambanan, Yogyakarta

Rice production in Indonesia is an important part of the national economy. Indonesia is the third-largest producer of rice in the world.

Rice is the staple food in the Indonesian diet, accounting for more than half of the calories in the average diet. A typical Indonesian meal consists of richly flavored side dishes, meat or poultry and vegetables, surrounding a pile of steamed rice.

Rice cultivation is the source of livelihood for about 20 million households, or about 100 million people, in the late 1980s. Rice cultivation covered a total of around 10 million hectares throughout the archipelago, primarily on sawah. Indonesia is the 3rd largest rice producer in the world after China and India. However, because of Indonesia's large population, the rice it produces is consumed internally.

As a vital necessity for Indonesian households, the government is responsible to regulate rice price and availability through Indonesian Bureau of Logistics (Bulog), which ensure its continuous supply and price stability. To ensure food security, the government fills the gap by importing from neighboring countries like Thailand, Vietnam and Cambodia.

The supply and control of water is crucial to the productivity of rice land, especially when planted with high-yield seed varieties. In 1987 irrigated sawah covered 58 percent of the total cultivated area, rainfed sawah accounted for 20 percent, and ladang, or dryland cultivation, together with swamp or tidal cultivation covered the remaining 22 percent of rice cropland.

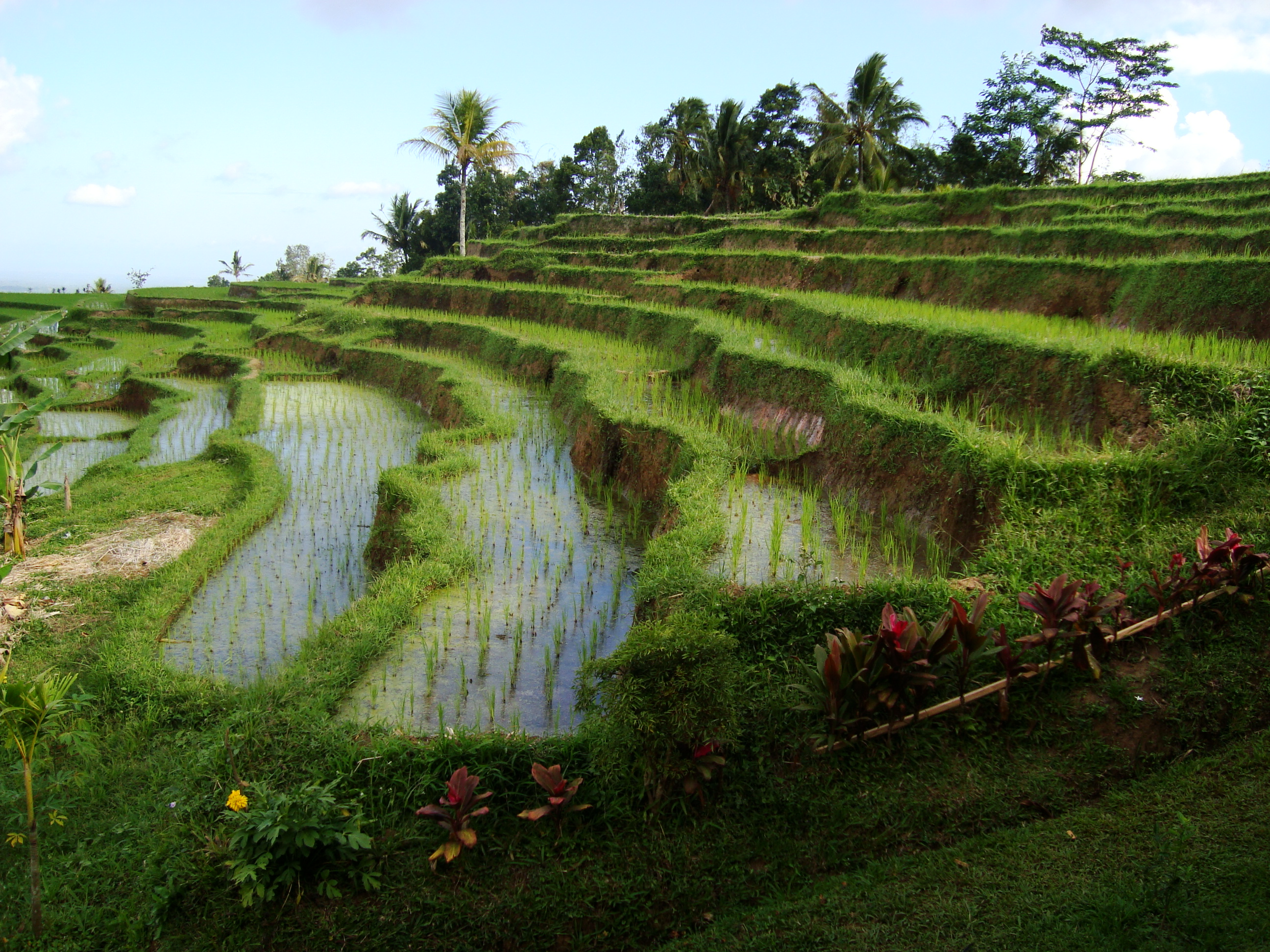
Rice paddy terraces in Bali.

=== Horticulture ===
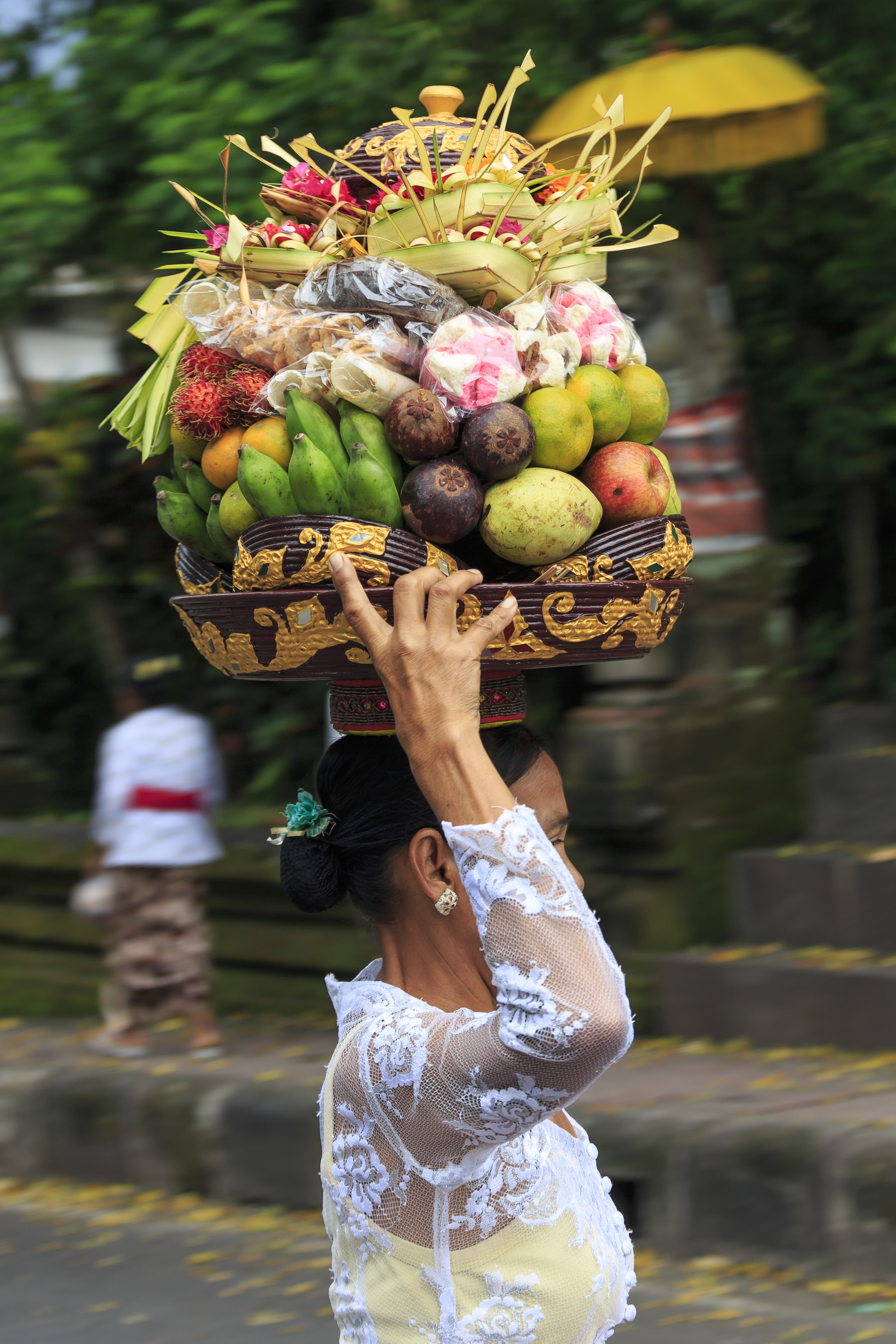
Fruit offering in Bali.

Horticulture, which covers fruits and vegetables production, holds an important role in the local Indonesian economy and in the attainment of food security. Indonesia possesses a variety of horticultural products. Its native fruits include durian, mangosteen, rambutan, salak, banana, jackfruit, mango, kedondong, jambu air, buni, jamblang and kecapi. The bulk of fruits and vegetables needed by consumers are supplied by local traditional farmers. The products prices are highly dependent on seasonal availability and proximity to production centers, due to transportation and cargo infrastructure restrictions. As a result, prices of horticulture products vary greatly throughout Indonesia. Prices might be cheaper in Bandung and Bukittinggi as they are closer to horticulture farms but are significantly more expensive in Pekanbaru and Balikpapan which are located far from production centers. Recently, owing to a varied Indonesian topography, non-tropical horticultural products such as apple, strawberry, honeydew, grapes and dragon fruit are grown in the cooler mountainous region of Indonesia. The mountainous region around Malang in East Java is the production center for apple and dragon fruit, while those around Bandung in West Java are the production centers for strawberry, honeydew and mushroom.

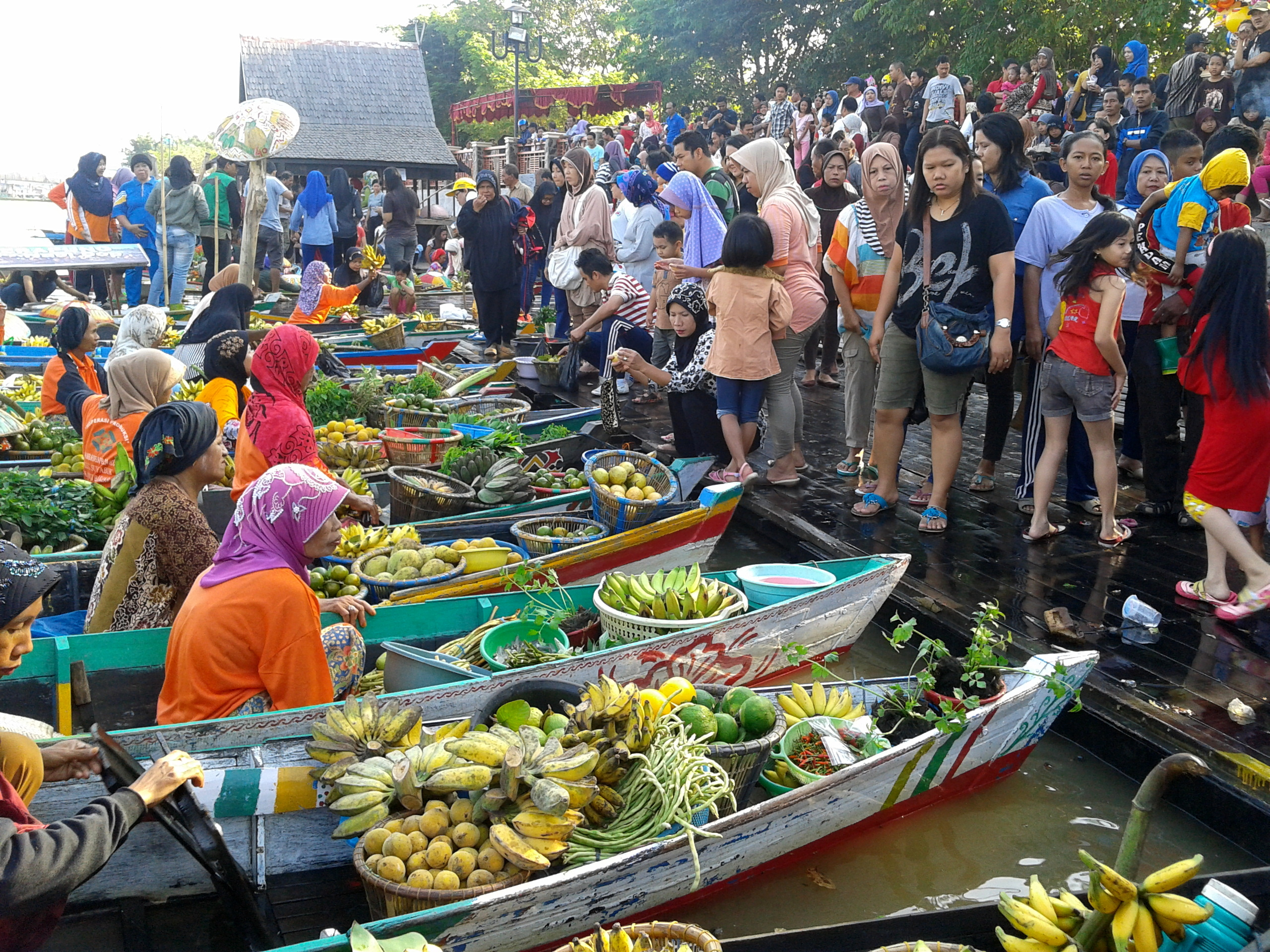
Floating market in Siring, Banjarmasin.

Despite its being home to the world's 4th largest population making it a huge market for horticultural products, the horticultural sector in Indonesia is deemed as under-performing which leads to the necessity of importing fruits and vegetables. Local Indonesian farmers face a difficult situation — the imported horticultural products are often cheaper and have a better quality than locally grown ones. Compared to neighboring countries with a well-developed horticultural sector like Thailand, Indonesia has much to improve. Currently, Indonesia imports much of its horticultural needs from Thailand (durian, carrot and chili pepper), China (garlic, orange and pear) and from the United States (soybean and apple). To protect local farmers, the Indonesian government applied protectionist policies on import settings for horticultural products, as well as restricting ports of entry. Bali has seen its first mushroom producer start in 2015.

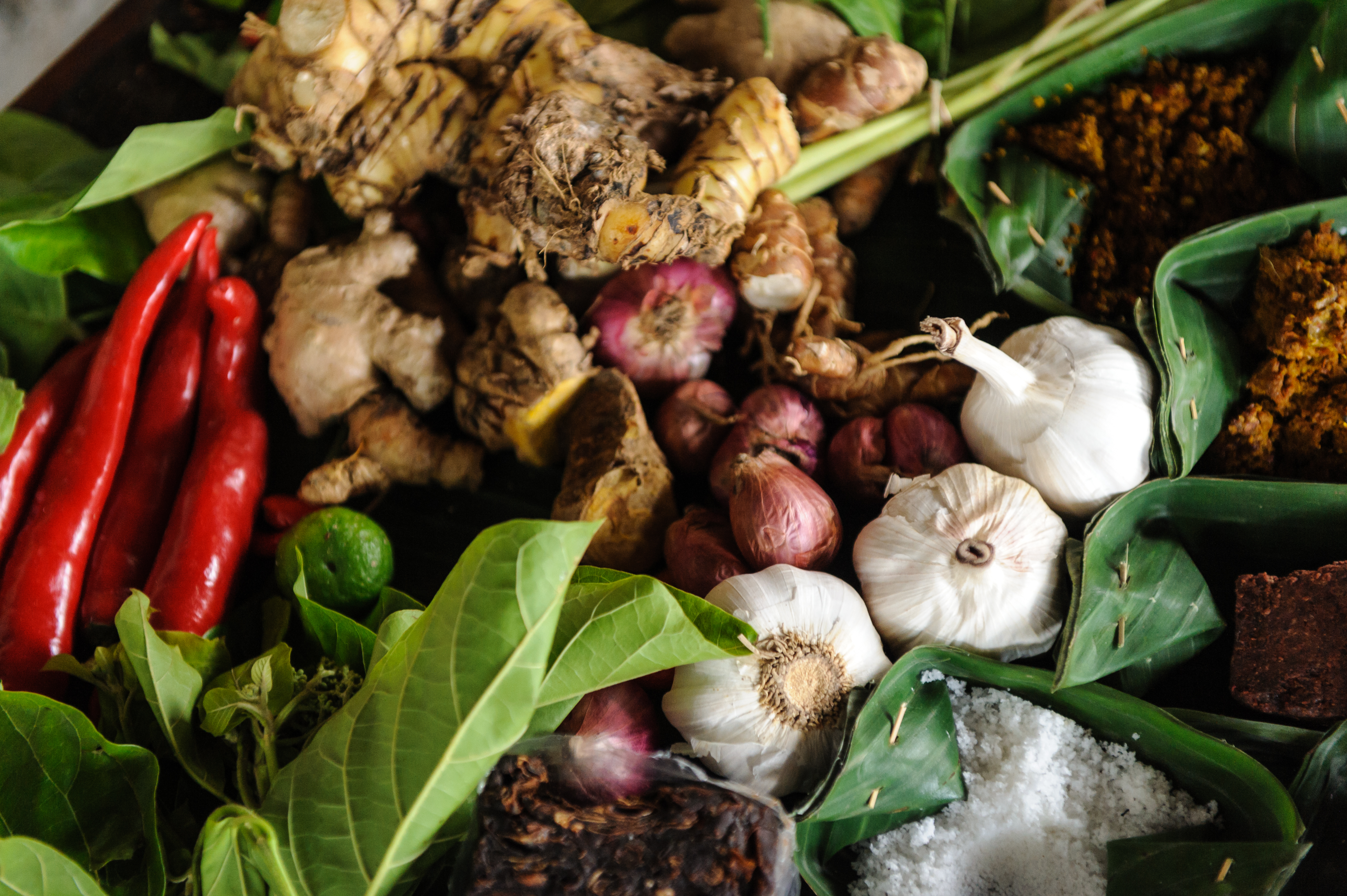
Various Indonesian spices.

Spice is an essential element in Indonesian cuisine. In Indonesian, spice is called rempah, while the mixture of spices is called bumbu, they are chopped finely or ground into paste using traditional stone mortar and pestle, and spread over vegetables, meat, poultry, fish and seafood to add aroma and taste. Known as the "Spice Islands", the Indonesian islands of Maluku contributed to the introduction of its native spices to the world. Spices such as pala (nutmeg/mace), cengkeh (clove), daun pandan (pandan leaves), kluwek (Pangium edule) and laos (galangal) are native to Indonesia. However, surprisingly nutmeg, mace and cloves are seldom used in Indonesian cuisine.

It is likely that lada hitam (black pepper), kunyit (turmeric), sereh (lemongrass), salam koja (curry leaf), bawang merah (shallot), kayu manis (cinnamon), kemiri (candlenut), ketumbar (coriander), and asam jawa (tamarind) were introduced from India or mainland Southeast Asia, while jahe (ginger), daun bawang (scallions) and bawang putih (garlic) were introduced from China. Those spices from mainland Asia were introduced early, in ancient times, thus they became integral ingredients in Indonesian cuisine. While the New World spices such as chili pepper and tomato were introduced by Portuguese and Spanish traders during the Age of Discovery in the 16th century.

== Commodities ==
=== Palm oil ===
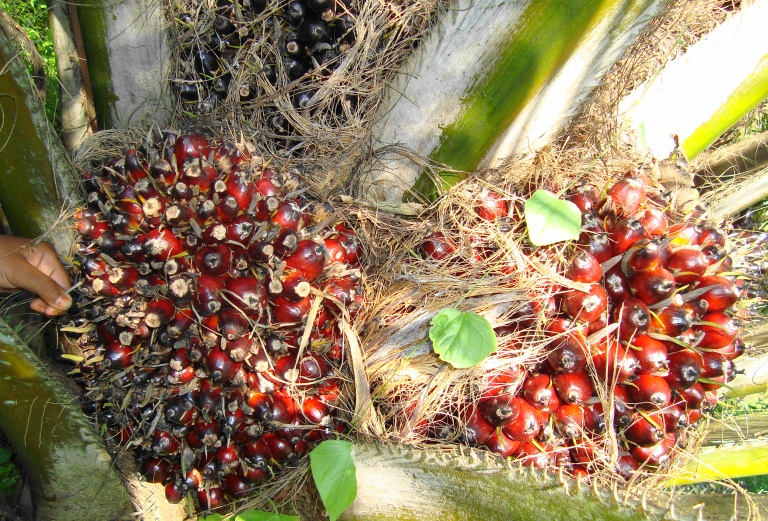
Palm oil bunch.

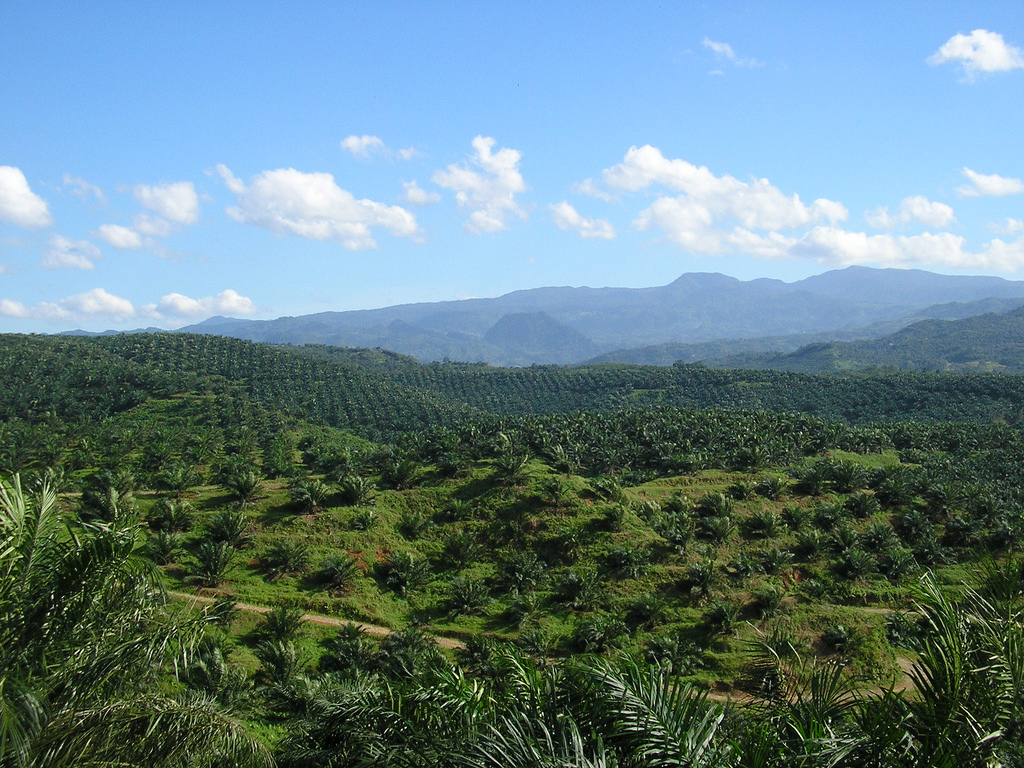
A palm oil plantation in Cigudeg, Bogor Regency, West Java.

Palm oil production is important to the economy of Indonesia as the country is the world's biggest producer and consumer of the commodity, providing about half of the world's supply. In 2016, Indonesia produced over 34.6 million metric tons (34,100,000 long tons; 38,100,000 short tons) of palm oil, and exported 25.1 million metric tons (24,700,000 long tons; 27,700,000 short tons) of it. Oil palm plantations stretch across at least 12 million hectares (30 million acres). There are several different types of plantations, including small, privately owned plantations, and larger, state-owned plantations. There are a variety of health, environmental, and societal impacts that result from the production of palm oil in Indonesia. A recent publication by the NGO Rainforest Action Network (RAN) indicates that the use of palm oil by some of the biggest chocolate and snacks' producers is increasing this problem.

In addition to servicing traditional markets, Indonesia is looking to put more effort into producing biodiesel. China and India are the major importers of palm oil, accounting for more than a third of global palm oil imports. Looking at Indonesia's GHG emissions breakdown, climate change mitigation will mainly come from controlling forest fires and peatland conservation. REDD+ (Reducing Emissions from Deforestation and Forest Degradation in Developing Countries) will be 'an important component of the NDC target from [the] land-use sector'. This implies that there will need to be large economic incentives and inputs from outside resources to ensure that land is conserved.

=== Coconut ===
Coconut production plays an important role in the national economy of Indonesia. According to figures published in December 2009 by the Food and Agriculture Organization of the United Nations, it is the world's second largest producer of coconuts, producing 15,319,500 tonnes in 2009.

Coconut plays an important role in Indonesian cuisine as well as its economy. Coconut milk is an important common ingredients in numbers of Indonesian favourites, including rendang and soto. According to figures published in December 2009 by the Food and Agriculture Organization of the United Nations, it is the world's second largest producer of coconuts, producing 15,319,500 tonnes in 2009.

=== Rubber ===
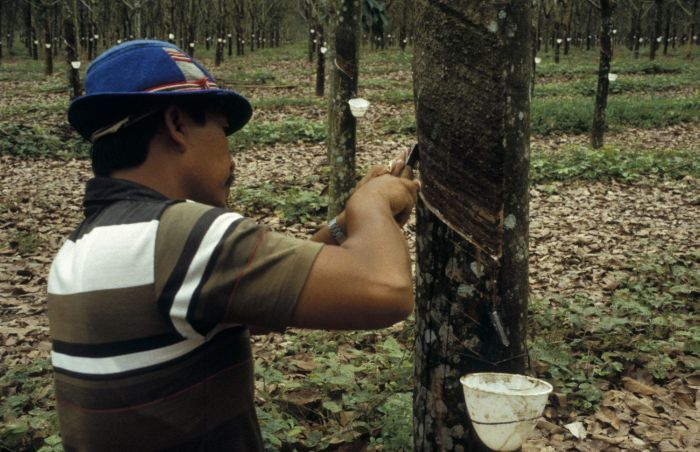
Rubber tapping near Siantar in North Sumatra in 1993.

Indonesian rubber industry take its root in colonial Dutch East Indies; in the early 20th century the rubber plantation in the colony was booming, largely owed to the advent of natural rubber tire industry to supply the growing automotive industry in the United States and Europe.

Currently, Indonesia's rubber production is the world's second-largest after Thailand. Natural rubber is an important export commodity that earn foreign exchange, with increasing production trend. In fact, ASEAN nations are among the largest natural rubber producers; the combined rubber yield of three ASEAN members — Thailand, Indonesia and Malaysia — accounts for nearly 66 percent of global total rubber production. However, compared to neighbouring countries, Indonesia's productivity level is lower (1,080 kg/ha), compared to Thailand (1,800 kg/ha), Vietnam (1,720 kg/ha) and Malaysia (1,510 kg/ha).

Majority of rubber estates in Indonesia are smallholder farmers, which retain for about 85 percent. This fact implied that the government and large private estates took a minor role in Indonesian rubber industry. Another problem is the lack of rubber processing facilities and manufacturing industry. In Indonesia, only a half of the natural rubber that is absorbed internally goes to the rubber products factories — while the rest are sold and exported as raw materials. Rubber processing facilities include tire manufacturing industry, followed by rubber gloves, rubber thread, footwear, retread tires, medical gloves, rubber carpets and various rubber tools.

=== Coffee ===
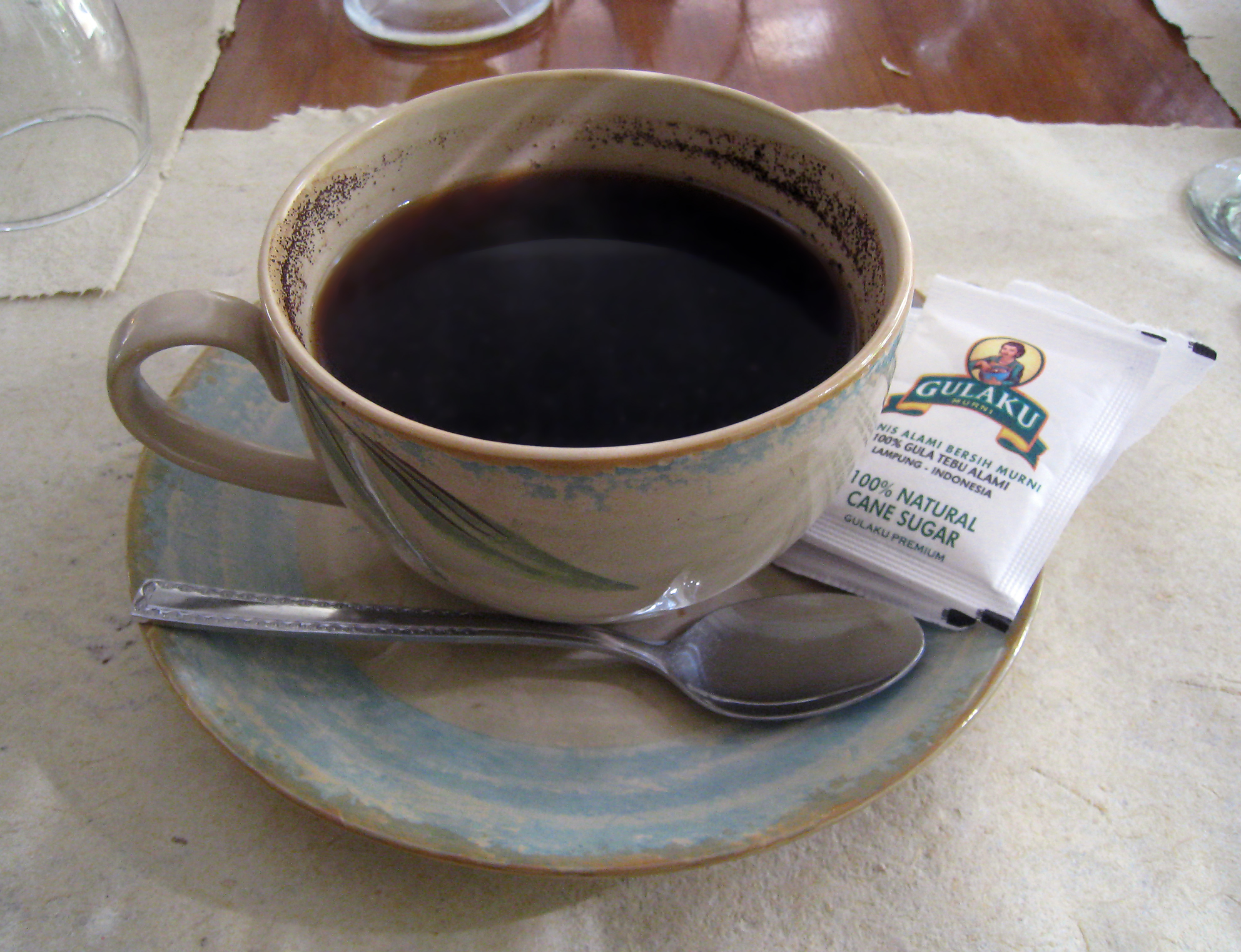
A cup of Java coffee.

In 2014, Indonesia was the fourth largest producer of coffee. Coffee in Indonesia began with its colonial history, and has played an important part in the growth of the country. Indonesia's geographic location is considered as ideal for coffee plantations. It is located near the equator and with numerous mountainous regions across the islands which creates suitable micro-climates for the growth and production of coffee.

Indonesia produced an estimated 540,000 metric tons of coffee in 2014. Of this total, estimated 154,800 tons was required for domestic consumption in the 2013–2014 financial year. Of the exports, 25% are arabica beans; the balance is robusta.

=== Tea ===
Indonesia is the world's sixth largest tea producer. Tea production in Indonesia began in the 18th century, introduced by the Dutch as cash crop. Indonesia produced 150,100 tonnes of tea in 2013. However, 65% of that was exported from the country, which suggests Indonesians relatively low tea consumption. Large parts of tea produced in Indonesian mainly is black tea, although small amounts of green tea are also produced. Moreover, most of Indonesian tea varieties do not enjoy global recognition, thus much of them are merely used in blends — mixed with other teas.

=== Tobacco ===
Indonesia is the fifth largest tobacco producer in the world, and also the fifth largest tobacco market in the world, and in 2008 over 165 billion cigarettes were sold in the country.

== Environmental issues ==
As agricultural pursuits altered the natural landscapes; from rainforest, peat lands and swamps into arable lands, certainly it poses natural and environmental consequences. Environmental problems such as deforestation and forest and plantation fires, caused by forestry and agricultural sectors in Indonesia, continue to be a persisting problem that needs to be addressed and solved.

=== Deforestation ===
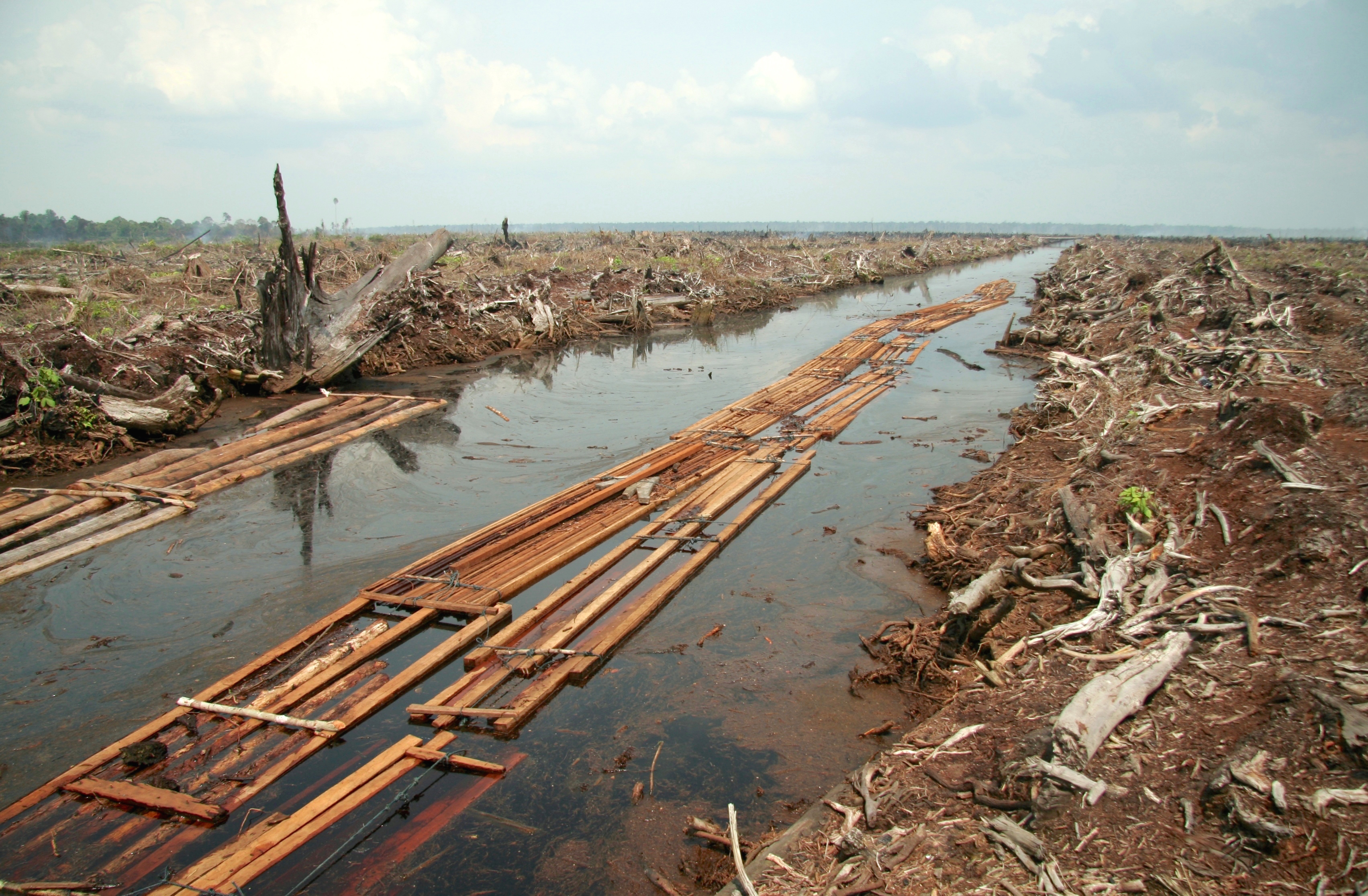
Deforestation in Riau (2006).

The deforestation in Indonesia is caused by logging industry, either legal or illegal, and in turn also contributed by the conversion of natural rainforest into agricultural lands, especially palm oil plantation. The large-scale expansion of palm oil plantations has been a main driver for clearance of Indonesian rainforests, which destroyed critical habitat for endangered species like rhinos, elephants, tigers and orangutans. Many of these endemic species have been pushed to the verge of extinction. This practice has raised international scrutiny on palm oil industry in Indonesia, especially from World Wide Fund for Nature, and raised the demand on sustainable palm oil production and certification.

Moreover, an increase in demand for wood pellets for biomass energy in both Europe and Asia, has led to a significant increase in extraction of forest materials for export. A 2024 study found that 99% of the demand for these biomass products came from the expansion of "green energy" policies dependent on biomass in Japan and South Korea.

=== Forest and plantation fires ===
Indonesian palm oil plantations' poor practice and poor environmental responsibility, has led to massive haze problem annually. Since 1997 Indonesia has been struggling to contain forest fires, especially on the islands of Sumatra and Kalimantan. Haze occurs annually during the dry season and is largely caused by illegal agricultural fires due to slash-and-burn practices in Indonesia, especially in the provinces of South Sumatra and Riau on Indonesia's Sumatra island, and Kalimantan on Indonesian Borneo. The haze that occurred in 1997 was one of the most severe; dense hazes occurred again in 2005, 2006, 2009, 2013, and the worst was in 2015, killing dozens of Indonesians as a result of respiratory illnesses and road accidents due to poor visibility.

=== Climate change ===
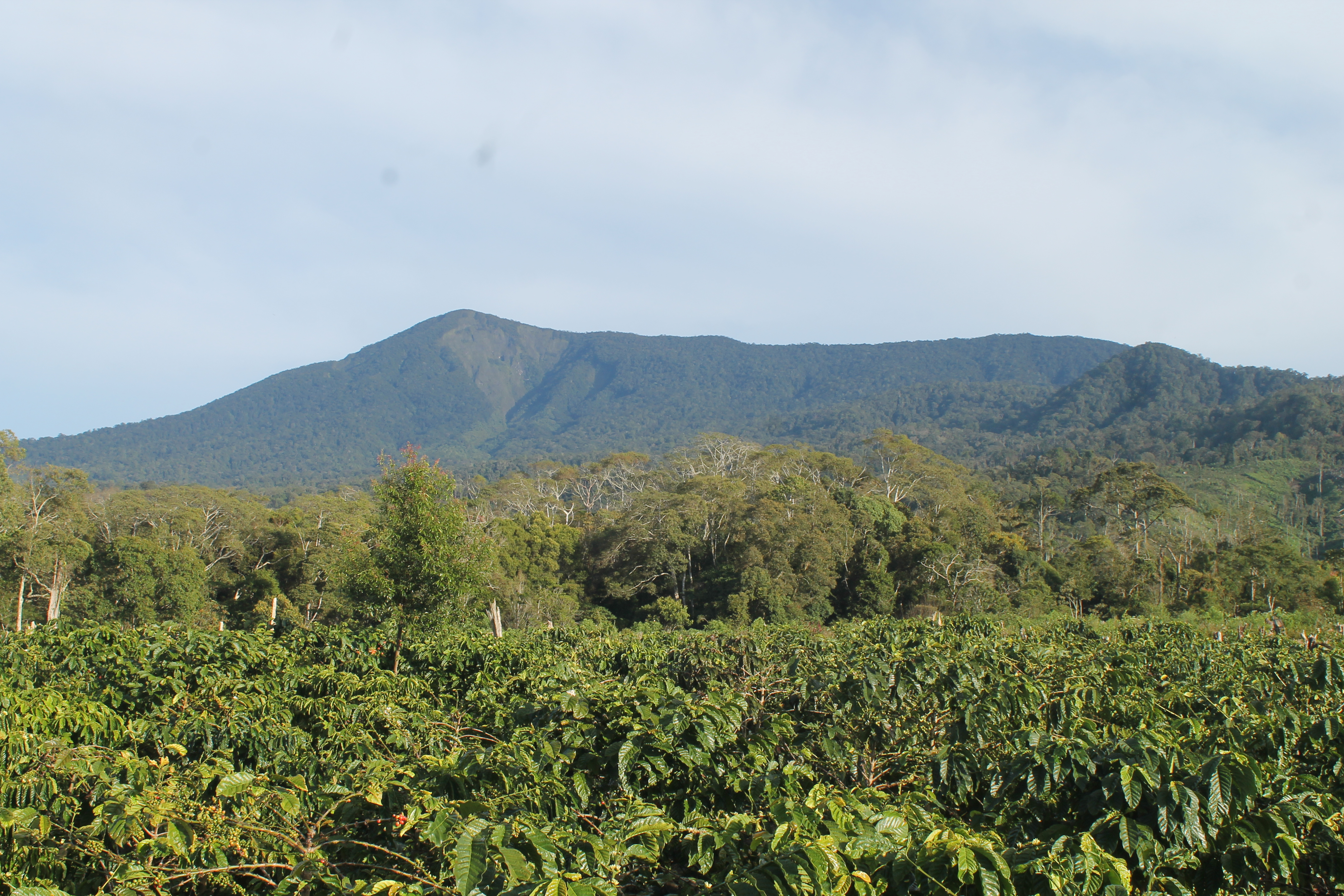
A coffee plantation in Bukit Barisan.

The agricultural sector builds the base of income for the lives of millions of Indonesians. The country's top export products are palm oil, cocoa, coffee, rice, spices, tea, coconuts, fruit and tobacco.

Temperatures, potentially rising by up to 1.5 °C by the year 2050 in a high-emission scenario, have a direct influence on agricultural productivity and thereby local food security. Higher heat stress combined with long-lasting and intensifying droughts induces reduced yields and comes with a higher incidence of pests and plant diseases.

Depending on the region, future climate projections show a complex variability of rainfall. The increasingly severe extreme events like floods and locally higher average precipitation will lead to a surplus of water, while generally higher temperatures along with intense droughts will make for large deficiencies. These disparities will directly impact agricultural productivity as well as the quantity and quality of goods that can be harvested.

Connected to missing or excessive rainfall patterns, soil degradation significantly reduces the fertility of land and therefore agricultural productivity causing economic losses.

In order to provide harvest efficiently, it becomes increasingly important to develop efficient water strategies for the irrigation of crops. Currently, more than half of the total irrigated agricultural area is estimated to have insufficiently maintained water infrastructure systems. Given that agricultural water demand is estimated to be rising to 52.1%, these inadequate water management conditions pose an issue and a threat to both the amount of water that can be supplied and its quality. For areas that depend heavily on irrigation systems, this is highly problematic.

In 2024, Indonesian President Joko Widodo unveiled a plan to swiftly deploy 20,000 water pumps nationwide to shield crops from extreme weather and bolster food security. The focus will be on regions that produce rice, a staple food for over 270 million Indonesians.

== See also ==
- Rice production in Indonesia
- Palm oil production in Indonesia
- Coconut production in Indonesia
- Coffee production in Indonesia
- Council of Palm Oil Producing Countries
