= 2005 Malaysian haze =

Air pollution crisis in Malaysia

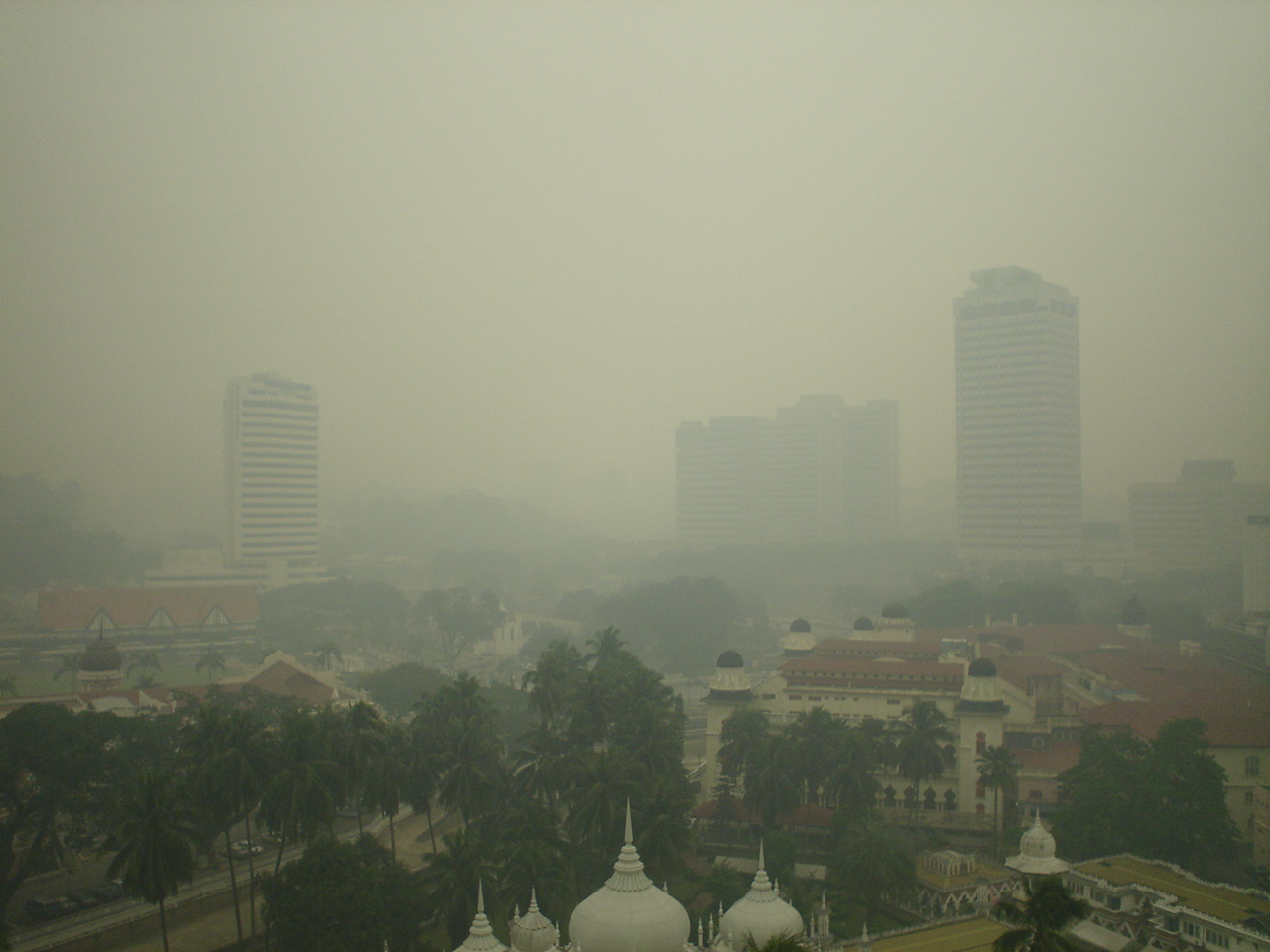
Smoke engulfing the country capital, Kuala Lumpur.

The 2005 Malaysian haze was an air pollution crisis caused primarily by fires in neighbouring Indonesia. In August 2005, haze spread across Malaysia from forest fires on the Indonesian island of Sumatra, leading to air quality reaching hazardous levels in certain states and the capital city, Kuala Lumpur. The Malaysian government declared states of emergency in affected regions, closed schools and held crisis talks with Indonesian officials. Farmers regularly burn scrub and forest to clear land during the dry season for agricultural purposes. The 2005 haze was at the time the worst to hit Malaysia since 1997.

On 10 August 2005, air quality in the Malaysian capital city of Kuala Lumpur was so poor that health officials advised citizens to stay at home with doors closed. Some schools were closed to keep children from being exposed to the haze.

== State of emergency in Port Klang and Kuala Selangor ==
On 11 August 2005, a state of emergency was announced for the world's 12th largest port, Port Klang and the district of Kuala Selangor after air pollution there reached dangerous levels (defined as a value greater than 500 on the Air Pollution Index or API). This was the first time the state of emergency had been imposed in Malaysia since the September 1997 haze, when Sarawak was placed in a state of emergency due to similar reasons.

The state of emergency in the two affected areas meant that schools, government officials, the port, and offices were closed. Shops carrying necessities, however, such as supermarkets and pharmacies remained open.

After the API levels dropped to acceptable levels, the state of emergency was lifted on 13 August.

== Resolution ==
By 13 August 2005, air quality and visibility returned to normal in Kuala Lumpur, as the haze moved northwards to the states of Perlis, Kedah and Penang, according to the Department of Environment's (JAS) API reading. On 16 August, air quality throughout Malaysia had returned to normal according to JAS statistics, as the haze was blown further northwards into Thailand.

Kuala Lumpur International Airport was unaffected during the hazy period but flights for non-ILS equipped planes from Subang airport were suspended until conditions cleared on 13 August.

Cloud seeding operations using RMAF C-130s were used throughout Malaysia, although the haze had moved north of Malaysia into Thailand and Cambodia.

Malaysia's Environment Minister, Adenan Satem, and Commodities Minister, Peter Chin, met with Indonesia's forestry minister and officials from its environment ministry in Medan. Malaysia had sent 125 firefighters while Australia had sent 12 bushfire experts to fight Indonesia's estimated more than a thousand forest and scrub fires (estimate reached by counting hotspots greater than 1 km on satellite imagery, example of such an image shown below).

Other nations pledged aid to Indonesia, including an offer from Singapore of planes for cloud seeding. Japan, South Korea and Thailand also offered help.

On 22 August, Malaysia extended its cloud seeding operations to include Indonesia, as requested by Indonesia.

The haze made a brief return on 11 September.

== API readings ==
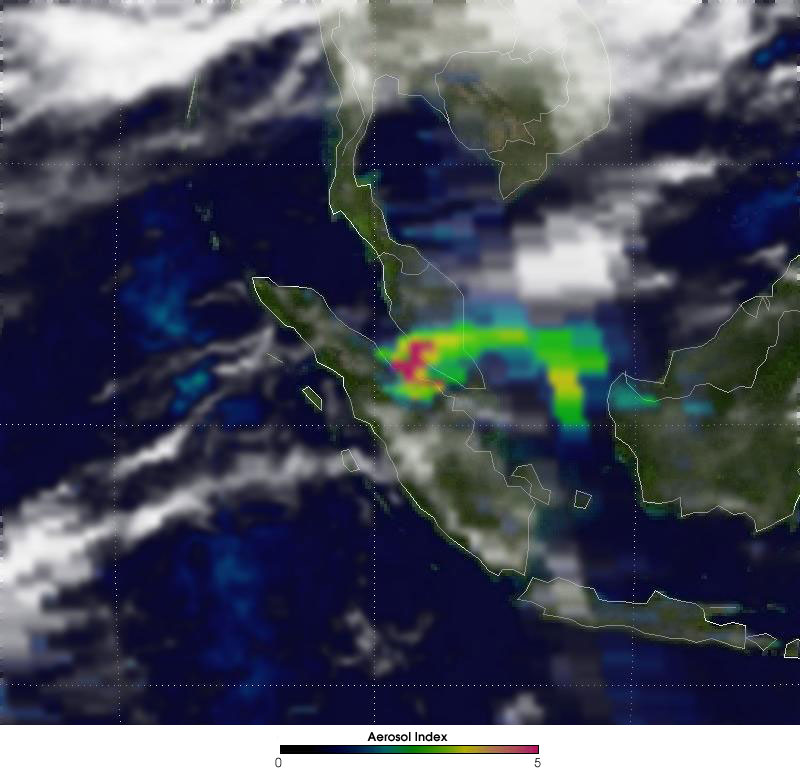
Density of the smoke on 10 August 2005

The air pollutant index readings (API) were released for the first time by the Malaysian government since 1997. Up to date readings are available for the 51 sites monitored automatically and continuously via the Department of Environment, Malaysia.

The following are API readings recorded during the onset of haze on 10 August 2005 (refer to this Related article from the New Straits Times):

- Port Klang 424
- Kuala Selangor 418
- Shah Alam 349
- Putrajaya 337
- Petaling Jaya 304
- Kuala Lumpur 276
- Tanjung Malim 205
- Gombak 200
- Country Heights, Kajang 185
- Nilai 174
- Seremban 137
- Jerantut 131
- Bukit Rambai, Malacca 107
