= Wildfires in 2024 =

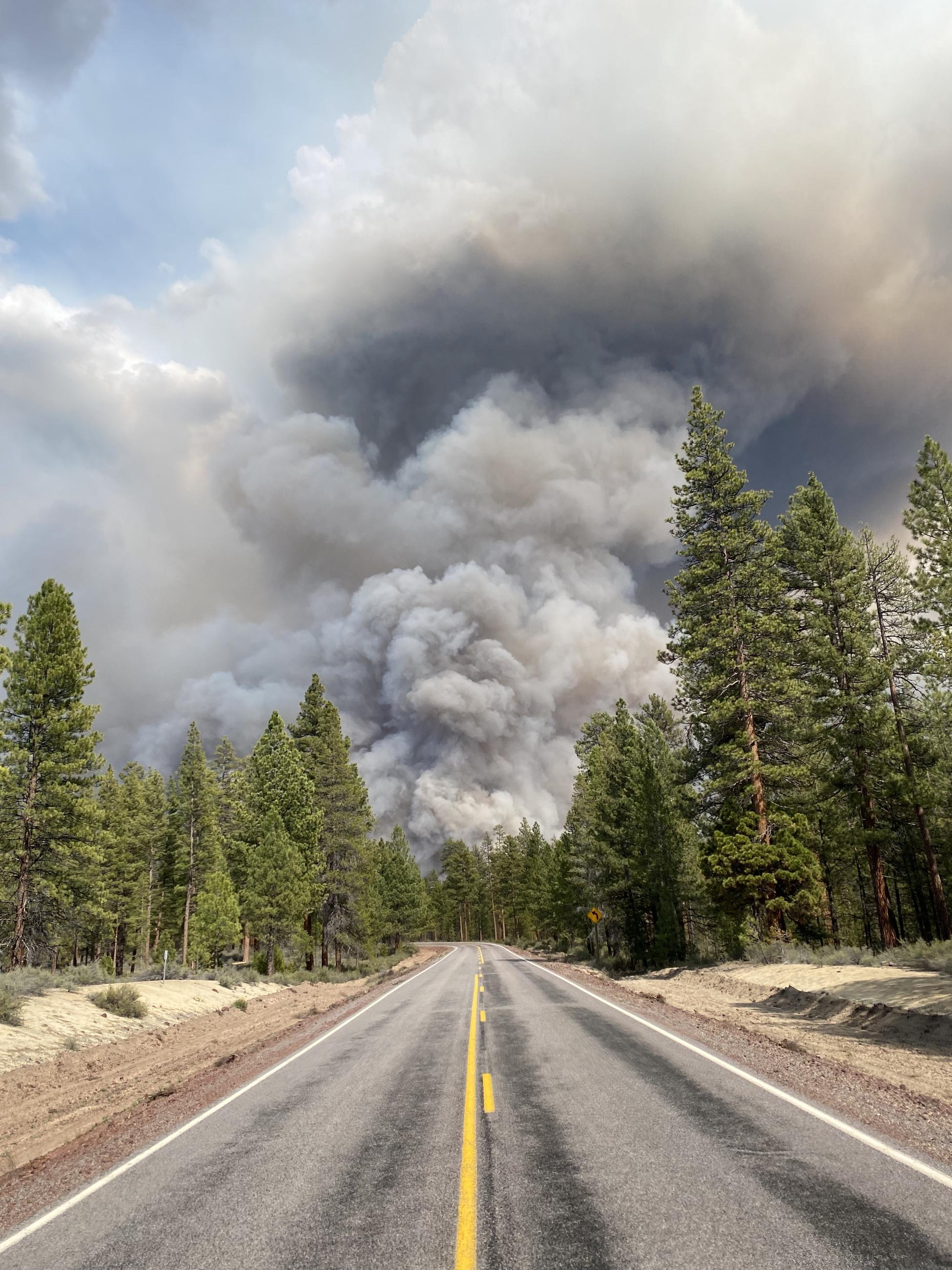
- The Little Yamsay Fire burning in Oregon
- Date: January–December 2024

The 2024 wildfire season involved wildfires on multiple continents.

Below is a list of articles on wildfires from around the world in the year 2024.

== Europe ==
- 2024 Attica wildfires
- 2024 Madeira wildfires
- 2024 Portugal wildfires

== West Asia ==
- 2024 Turkey wildfires
- 2024 Israel-Lebanon wildfires

== Southern hemisphere ==
- 2024 South American wildfires
  - 2024 Brazil wildfires
  - 2024 Chile wildfires
  - 2024 Colombia wildfires
  - 2024 Peru wildfires
- 2024 Port Hills fire, New Zealand

== Northern hemisphere ==
- 2024 United States wildfires
  - 2024 Arizona wildfires
    - Adams Fire
    - Freeman Fire
    - Watch Fire
    - Waterman Fire
    - Wildcat Fire
  - 2024 California wildfires
    - 2024 Kern County wildfires
      - Borel Fire
    - Airport Fire
    - Basin Fire
    - Boise Fire
    - Bridge Fire
    - Coffee Pot Fire
    - Corral Fire
    - Franklin Fire
    - Horseshoe Fire
    - Lake Fire
    - Line Fire
    - Mountain Fire
    - Nixon Fire
    - Park Fire, the fourth largest wildfire in California history.
    - Pedro Fire
    - Point Fire
    - Post Fire
    - 2024 SQF Lightning Complex
    - Thompson Fire
  - 2024 Colorado wildfires
    - Spruce Creek Fire
    - Alexander Mountain Fire
    - Bucktail Fire
  - 2024 Florida wildfires
  - 2024 Idaho wildfires
  - 2024 Montana wildfires
  - 2024 Nevada wildfires
    - Pizona Fire
    - Davis Fire
  - 2024 New Mexico wildfires
    - South Fork Fire
    - Salt Fire
  - 2024 Northeastern United States wildfires
  - 2024 Oklahoma wildfires
  - 2024 Oregon wildfires
    - Durkee Fire
    - Little Yamsay Fire
  - 2024 Texas wildfires
    - Smokehouse Creek Fire, the largest in Texas history
  - 2024 Utah wildfires
  - 2024 Virginia wildfires
  - 2024 Washington wildfires
    - Pioneer Fire
    - Retreat Fire
    - Swawilla Fire
  - 2024 Wyoming wildfires
- 2024 Canada wildfires
- 2024 Russian wildfires
