= Boise Fire =

2024 wildfire in California, USA

- Part of the 2024 California wildfires
- Fire crews working the fire on August 10
- Date: August 9, 2024 – September 20, 2024
- Location: Humboldt and Siskiyou counties, California, United States
- Coordinates: 41.252766°N 123.511358°W

Statistics
- Burned area: 12,967 acres (5,248 ha; 20 sq mi; 52 km^{2})

Impacts
- Deaths: 0
- Injuries: Unknown
- Structures lost: Unknown

Ignition
- Cause: Under investigation

Map
- Location of the fire in Northern California

The Boise Fire was a wildfire that burned in the Six Rivers National Forest in Northern California. It began on August 9, and burned 12,967 acres of land before being contained on September 20.

== Progression ==
The fire started on August 9, and by August 12 had grown to 1,621 acres and 27 personnel were assigned to the fire, including 7 helicopters. Crews worked to construct containment lines along the Le Perron Flat and Orleans Look out Road. Fire conditions on August 11 and 12 had cooler temperatures and an overnight moisture recovery. Firefighters were approaching with a full suppression strategy and tried to establish containment lines on the east part of the fire. The fire had grown to about 7,223 acres (2,923 ha). On August 13, crews began to prioritize the protection of structures along Le Perron Flat, and a dozerline was erected. By August 14, evacuation orders were given out for residents near the fire in Humboldt and Siskiyou counties.

On August 15, fire lines were improved, and priorities of the fire crews shifted from construction of fire lines to keeping the footprint size minimal. By August 16, it was determined to have burned 12,842 acres of land, and on August 17 crews worked to improve fire and dozer lines along the Orleans, Pearch Creek and Short Ranch areas. By August 19, priorities again shifted to containment along the Trinity Alps Wilderness. On September 20, the fire reached 100% containment.

== Effects ==
=== Closures ===
The Boise Fire resulted in a forest closure for Six Rivers National Forest.

=== Evacuations ===
Evacuation orders and warnings were sent out for residents of areas near the fire.

== See also ==
- Park Fire
- Borel Fire
- Pedro Fire
- Nixon Fire
- 2024 California wildfires
- 2024 Washington wildfires
