= 2024 SQF Lightning Complex =

2024 wildfire complex in Southern California

- Part of the 2024 California wildfires
- Date: July 13, 2024 –; September 17, 2024; (66 days)
- Location: Tulare County, California
- Coordinates: 35.986772°N 118.311422°W

Statistics
- Burned area: 33,026 acres (13,365 ha; 52 sq mi; 134 km^{2})

Impacts
- Deaths: 0
- Injuries: 0
- Structures lost: 0

Ignition
- Cause: Lightning

Map
- Perimeters of the Trout & Long fires (map data)

The 2024 SQF Lightning Complex was a large wildfire complex that started on July 13, 2024, in the Domeland Wilderness, northeast of Kernville in Tulare County, California. The fires burned a total of 33,026 acres (13,365 hectares) before reaching full containment on September 17. The complex consisted of the Trout, Packsaddle, Acorn, and Long fires, all caused by a lightning storm in July.

The 2024 SQF Lightning Complex was the sixth largest fire and the largest wildfire complex in California's 2024 wildfire season, behind the Lake Fire in Santa Barbara County.

== Background ==
The Sequoia National Forest has been known for large, destructive wildfires and was the location of the deadly 2016 Erskine Fire and the destructive 2020 SQF Complex fire. The specific area of the fires in the Domeland Wilderness has had limited burn history, aside from the Manter Fire in the 2000 California wildfire season.

== Progression ==
The Trout Fire ignited at about 8:40 a.m. PDT on Saturday, July 13, after a lightning storm ignited multiple fires in the Sequoia National Forest. Due to the steep, rugged terrain of the area and the limited accessibility, the fire was able to increase in activity along the Trout Creek Drainage area of the Domeland Wilderness. Later that day at about 3:30 p.m. PDT, a second fire had ignited by lightning and was known as the Packsaddle Fire. By the morning of July 14, the Packsaddle Fire had grown to approximately 46 acres (19 ha). The Packsaddle Fire remained smoldering until it reached 100% containment on July 20, 2024. By the morning of July 15, the Trout Fire had expanded to 500 acres (202 ha) and aircraft had been utilized.

The Long Fire ignited at about 3:50 p.m. PDT on Monday, July 15 in the Domeland Wilderness, 5 miles east of Black Mountain. By the evening of July 16, the Trout Fire had reached 2,095 acres (848 ha) and the Long Fire had reached 160 acres (65 ha).

The Trout and Long fires quickly continued their aggressive spread through the Domeland Wilderness, reaching a combined 12,790 acres (5,176 ha) by the morning of July 18. Additionally, evacuation warnings were issued for areas of the Domeland Wilderness due to the surge in fire activity.

The fires raged further across the Domeland Wilderness, reaching a combined 23,661 acres (9,575 ha) by morning of July 21. By July 24, containment began to increase on the complex as the fires slowed in progression, bringing the total acreage to 33,109 acres (13,399 ha).

As firefighters increased containment lines around both fires and weather conditions improved, growth of the fires slowed. Containment of the fires improved very slowly during the month of August before the Trout Fire was fully contained on September 5, and the Long Fire was contained on September 17. By the time the complex was contained, the fires burned a total of 33,026 acres (13,365 ha; 51.603 sq mi).

== See also ==
- Borel Fire
- Line Fire
- 2024 California wildfires
