= Coffee Pot Fire =

2024 wildfire in California, USA

- Part of the 2024 California wildfires
- The southwestern flank of the fire on August 15
- Date: August 3, 2024 –; December 16, 2024; (135 days)

Statistics
- Perimeter: 100% contained
- Burned area: 14,104 acres (5,708 ha; 22 sq mi; 57 km^{2})

Impacts
- Deaths: 0
- Injuries: 3
- Structures lost: Unknown

Ignition
- Cause: Lightning

The 2024 Coffee Pot Fire was a large wildfire in Tulare County, California. It began on August 3, and was contained on December 16. It was the 14th-biggest fire of the 2024 California wildfire season, and the longest lasting fire of the season.

== Progression ==
A helicopter dropping fire retardant on September 7

The fire began as a result of a lightning strike on the morning of August 3, and had little growth until a large tree fell, igniting the fire further. By August 14 the fire had reached 50 acres (20 ha) in size. The fire began to move into steep terrain the following day, and a fire command post was set up in Three Rivers as fire crews began to dig fire lines. On August 15, 70 personnel were assigned to the fire, including several helicopters. On August 17 the fire had reached 228 acres (92 ha) in size, and by August 19 it had rapidly grown to a size of 869 acres (352 ha) while 353 personnel worked to fight it.

The smoke plume from the fire on September 11

On August 20 the southern portions of the fire had begun to push into the Surprise Grove area, and on August 22 an evacuation warning was issued for areas directly west of the Sequoia National Park. The fire reached 2,683 acres (1,086 ha) in size the following day, and crews conducted aerial firefighting operations. On August 24 the number of personnel assigned to the fire increased to 918, and by August 28 the number had again increased to 1,312. On August 29 the fire had grown to 5,683 acres (2,300 ha) in coverage, and the fire began to push toward the Kaweah River. Containment on the fire reached 11% for the first time on August 31 as several fire lines were completed.

On September 1, more evacuation warnings were issued encompassing the communities of Cabin Cove, Silver City and Mineral King. Containment on the fire reached 13% on September 2, and 1,369 crews worked to contain it. By September 8, the fire had covered 13,347 acres (5,401 ha), and on September 9 fire retardant was dropped on the northeastern portions of the fire. Containment was declared to be at 37% on September 10, and many evacuation warnings sent out due to the fire were lowered. The fire reached 13,715 acres (5,550 ha) on September 11 and breached several control lines that were set up along the Horse Creek area.

Containment on the fire reached 41% on September 12, and the fire itself had reached a size of 13,999 acres (5,665 ha) while a crew of 1,092 personnel worked to contain it. On September 13, containment had been pushed up to 59% while crews retained fire lines.

== Effects ==
3 firefighters were confirmed to have been injured by the fire.

== See also ==
- Park Fire
- Borel Fire
- Pedro Fire
- Nixon Fire
- 2024 California wildfires
