= Lake Fire (2024) =

2024 wildfire in Southern California, USA

- Part of the 2024 California wildfires
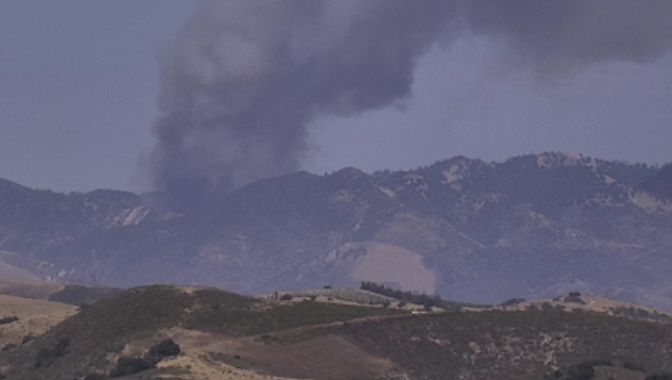
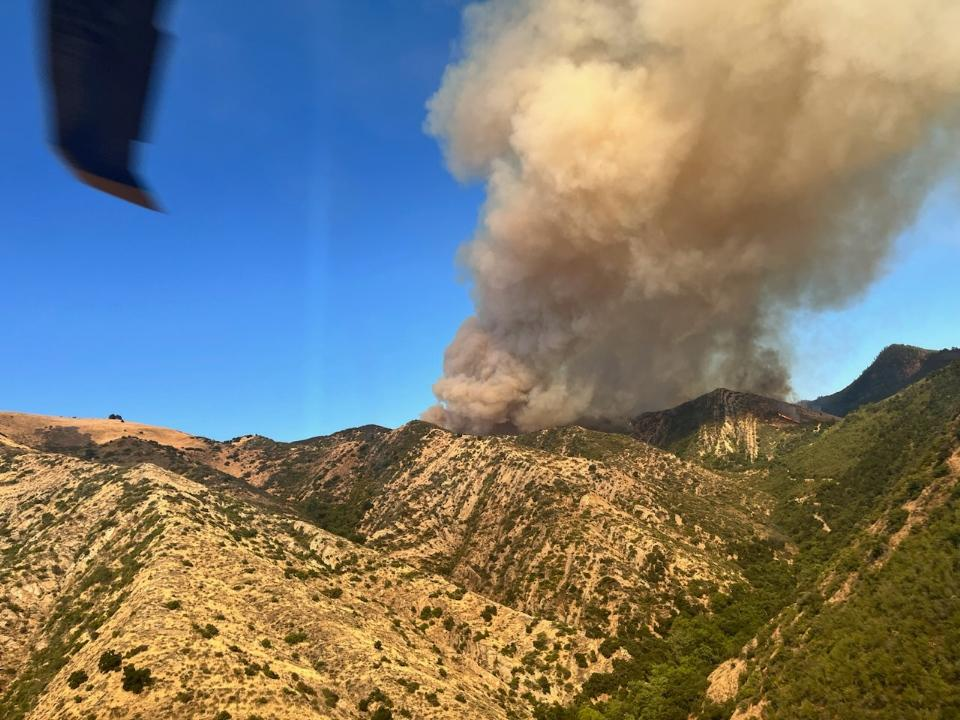
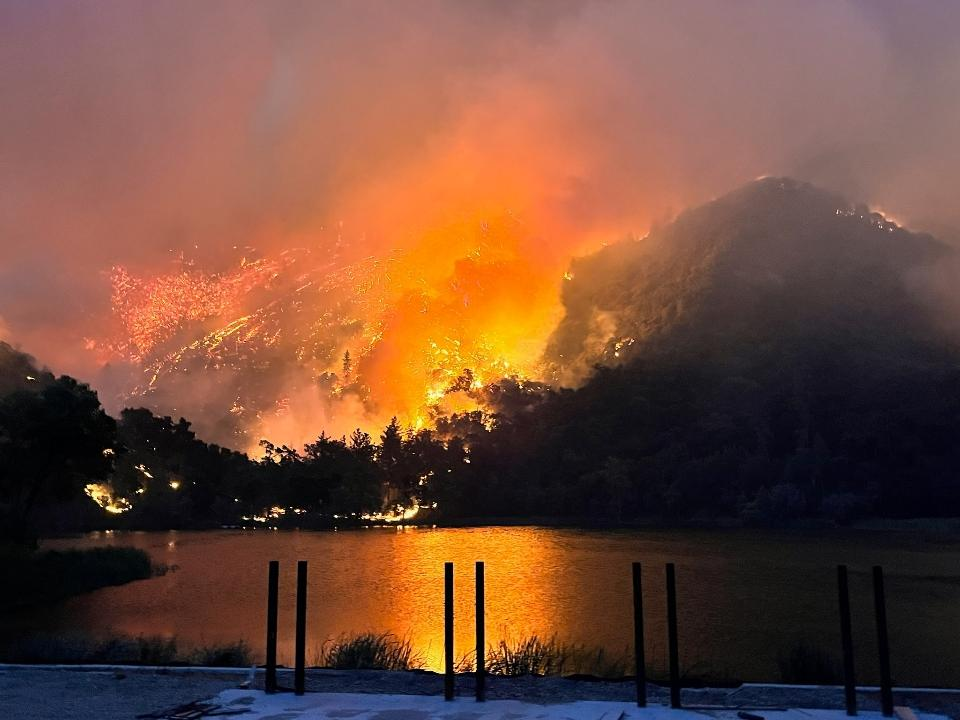
- Clockwise from top: The smoke plume from the fire rising above Zaca Lake on July 7, the fire as seen during the night, an aerial view of the smoke plume
- Date: July 5, 2024 – August 4, 2024

Statistics
- Perimeter: 100% contained
- Burned area: 38,664 acres (15,647 ha; 60 sq mi; 156 km^{2})

Impacts
- Deaths: 0
- Injuries: 7 firefighters
- Structures destroyed: 4 destroyed, 1 damaged

Ignition
- Cause: Unknown
- Motive: Under investigation

Map
- Perimeter of the Lake Fire (2024) (map data)

The Lake Fire was a large wildfire that burnt 38,664 acres of land in Santa Barbara County, California. It began on July 5, 2024, and was 100% contained as of August 4. The fire was the first to burn more than 20,000 acres as part of the 2024 California wildfire season, and was the fourth fire of the season to injure more than one person.

== Progression ==
The fire started as a small vegetation fire on July 5, at around 3:48 p.m, near Zaca Lake. The fire grew rapidly through grass and brush during a prolonged heat wave across the west coast. Road closures accompanied the firefighting response on the same day. By July 8, the fire had grown to 20,320 acres, and 1,162 personnel were assigned to firing operations. On the morning of July 9, the fire had again grown, covering 26,176 acres and reaching 12% containment. The east side of the fire was noted as having the highest rate of activity. Evacuation orders were placed for parts of the Figueroa Mountain, and an evacuation warning was issued for the Goat Rock area.

On July 10, the fire had reached 28,987 acres in size, and an estimated 1,500 people were evacuated from areas near the fire. Containment reached 16% on the same day. On July 11, the fire covered 34,015 acres of grass and brush, and was split into a North Zone (A) and South Zone (B). The fire in the North Zone straddled Happy Canyon Road, but never crossed it due to counter-fire efforts from firefighters.

By July 12, the fire covered 36,707 acres and remained at 16% containment. 3,411 personnel were assigned to the fire. The fire began to slowly move down the Sisquoc River, and continued moving through areas near Davey Brown.The Goat Rock area also reminded threatened by the fire. On July 13, the fire continued to be active in the Davey Brown, Ranger Peak and Goat Rock areas, and covered 37,472 acres by 10:00 p.m. the same day. Containment on the fire reached 19% around the same time.

On July 14, the fire had grown slightly, covering 37,872 acres and retaining 19% containment. The fire made small pushes uphill in the South Zone. On July 15, the fire had reached 38,430 acres, a slight increase from the previous day. Containment on the fire jumped to 34%, and the number of personnel assigned to the fire also increased to 3,546. In the North Zone, firefighters continued to patrol the fire edge located on the Sisquoc River, and Happy Canyon Road continued to be encroached by the fire.

On July 16, the fire had again gained slightly in acreage, reaching 38,653 acres by 8:40 a.m. and containment reaching 38% around the same time. Fire crews were transported via helicopter to the remote areas of the Zaca Ridge located in the North Zone, where the fire was actively burning. Forest Route 10N06 was closed as a result of the fire. By July 17, the fire only gained 10 acres, covering 38,663 acres by 10 a.m. the same day. The number of personnel assigned to the fire also lowered, with 3,247 personnel responding to the fire. Firefighters along the southeast perimeter of the fire began to prioritize the destruction of smoldering ash and embers left by the fire.

By July 18, the fire had stayed within its original footprint, gaining no acreage. Containment on the fire had almost doubled from July 16, with 63% of the fire contained. On July 19, firefighters made further progress on containment of the fire, with 73% contained. California Complex Incident Management Team 2 (CA-CIMT2) also took command of the fire, and an unmanned aerial system was used to locate smoldering ash and other potentially ignited material.

On July 20, containment and acreage of the fire remained consistent with previous days, but the number of personnel assigned to the fire again dropped to 2,055. Fire crews continued constructing fire lines in the northern portions of the fire. On July 21, the fire had gained 1 acre, and the North and South Zones were dissolved, merging back into one larger complex. Fire crews searched for potential unburned fuel on the eastern portions of the fire. The eastern part of Zaca Lake Road, Forest Route 10N06 and Happy Canyon Road remained closed due to the fire.

By July 22, the fire had been 90% contained, and the number of personnel assigned to the fire lowered to 1,614. Fire crews prioritized the extinguishing of hot spots, with the aid of aerial vehicles, including a helicopter. Many roads remained closed as a result of the fire, and fire crews also began to haul equipment away from the immediate perimeter of the fire. On July 23, the number of personnel responding to the fire again lowered to 995, and containment on the fire remained at 90%.

On July 24, all evacuation orders related to the fire were cancelled, but the Los Padres National Forest remained closed. Fire suppression and repair was prioritized by the remaining 909 personnel. Crews also worked to the south of the historic Manzana School House to the fire perimeter. Along the southern perimeter of the fire, suppression repair was around 95% complete.

On July 25, the number of personnel responding to the fire lowered to 746, and the remaining fire crews worked with suppression repair. Inflicting minimal environmental damage as a result of fire suppression was also prioritized. By July 26, fire crews worked to minimize soil erosion from the fire suppression efforts. Fire crews also continued observing the fire edge and perimeters, to prevent any potential flare-ups of material. The Los Padres National Forest closure notice was not lifted, and the area remained closed to the public as a result of the fire. At 7:00 a.m. on July 27, command over the fire was handed off to a Type 3 Incident Management Team from the Los Padres National Forest.

On August 4, the fire was declared 100% contained.

== Effects ==
=== Evacuations ===
An estimated 2,166 were evacuated as a direct result of the fire.

== See also ==
- Park Fire
- Borel Fire
- Pedro Fire
- Nixon Fire
- 2024 Washington wildfires
