= Basin Fire =

2024 wildfire in Central California, USA

- Part of the 2024 California wildfires
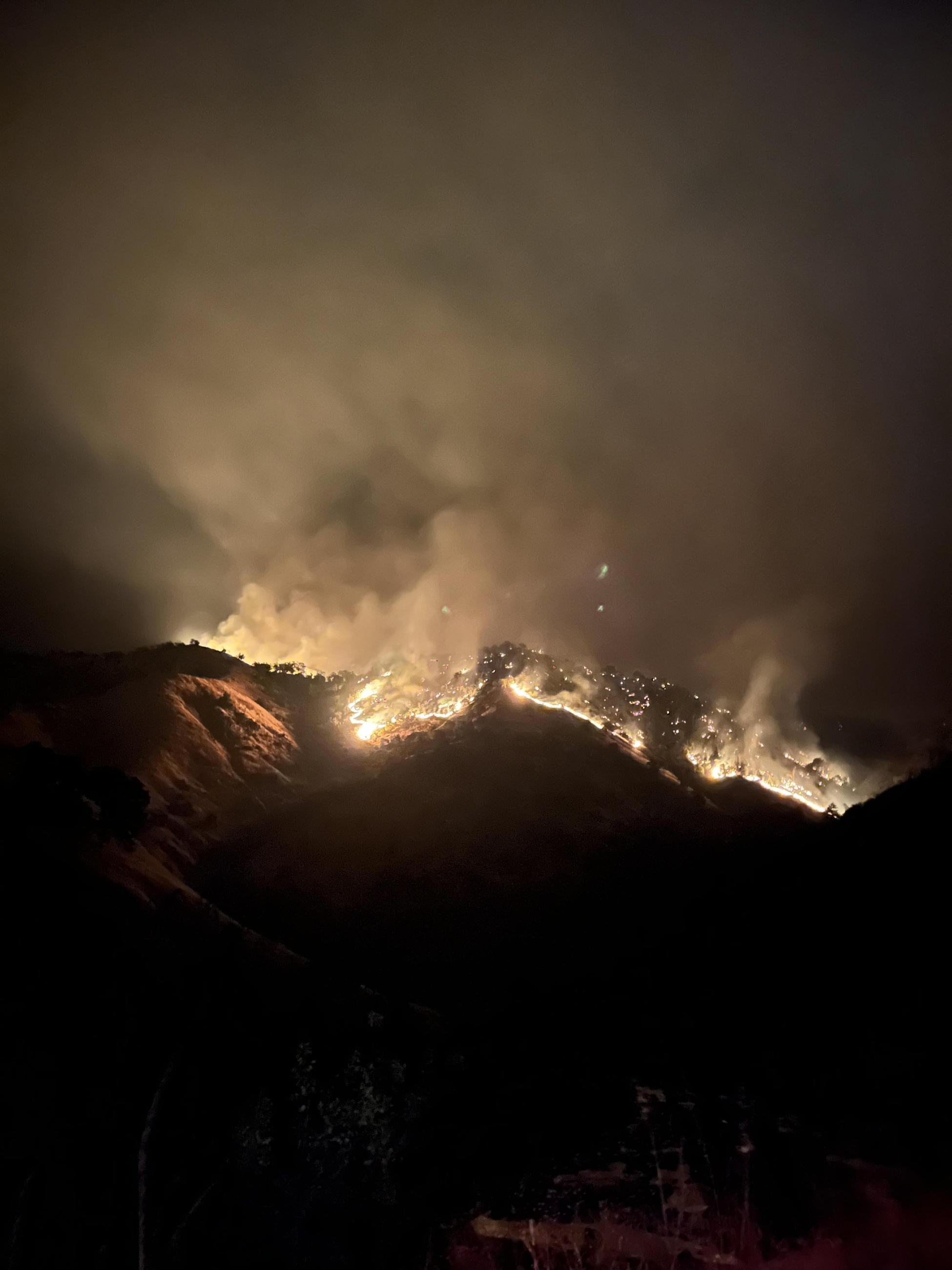
- The fire burning on the night of July 7
- Date: June 26, 2024 – July 20, 2024

Statistics
- Perimeter: 100% contained
- Burned area: 14,023 acres (5,675 ha; 22 sq mi; 57 km^{2})

Impacts
- Deaths: 0
- Injuries: 0
- Structures lost: 0

Ignition
- Cause: Unknown

The Basin Fire was a wildfire that burned through Fresno County in Central California between June 26 and July 20, 2024. It prompted numerous evacuations, and was the fourth fire to burn more than 14,000 acres as part of the 2024 California wildfire season.

== Progression ==
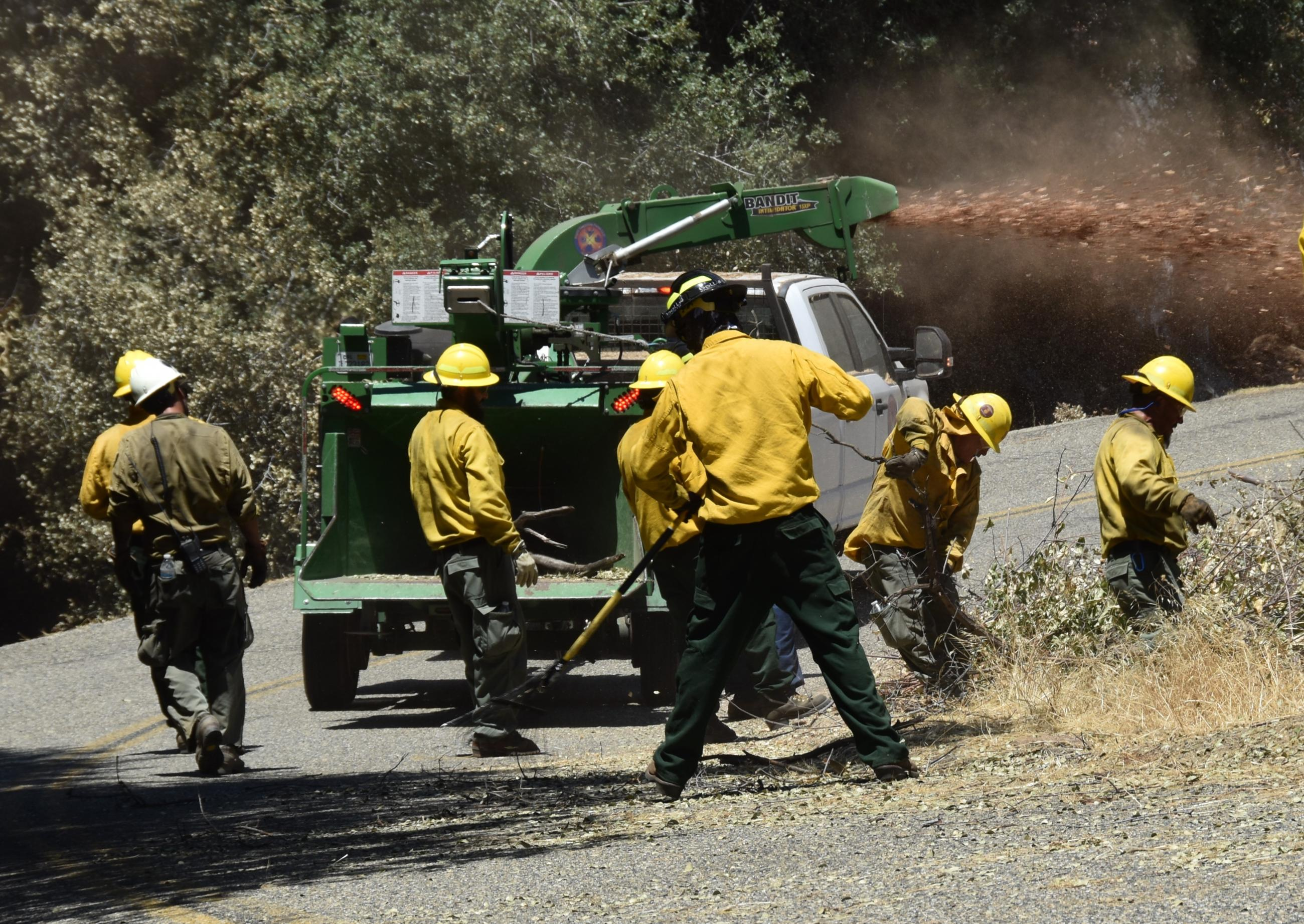
Fire crews working the fire on July 7

The fire started on June 26, less than a mile north of the Green Cabin Flat Campgrounds., and by June 28 the fire had already reached 7,462 acres. One airplane and 9 helicopters were assigned to the fire, along with 430 personnel. Evacuation warnings were also sent out for areas north of Elwood. On June 27, the fire had stayed at the same acreage, and fire crews prioritized the stoppage of the fire near the southern portions of the Kings River.

By June 30, the fire had reached 11,047 acres in size, and was determined to be burning in and near the footprint of the 2015 Rough Fire. 697 total personnel were assigned to the fire. On July 1, the fire had gained another 1,584 acres, covering a total of 12,631 acres by the end of the day. A spot fire near Rancheria Creek was contained by fire crews. On July 2, the fire was determined to have an acreage of 13,166, and the first parts of the fire were contained, reaching a total of 17% containment by the end of the day. The number of personnel responding to the fire jumped to 951, including 9 helicopters and 65 fire engines.

At 11:00 a.m. on July 3, the fire had covered a total of 13,166 acres over a period of 7 days, and was 26% contained, width fire crews prioritizing containment in and around the Kings River area. On July 4, the fire was determined to be 46% contained, and the total number of personnel assigned to the fire was 1,340. The southern and western perimeters of the fire were largely secured.

By July 5, the fire had reached 14,020 acres in size, and containment on the fire stayed at 46%. A red flag warning was issued by the National Weather Service that accompanied western portions of the fire. On July 6, the Sierra National Forest was partially closed as a direct result of the fire. On July 7, acreage on the fire stayed consistent with previous days but containment on the fire reached 60%. A helicopter landing area was initiated near Dinkey Creek, and bulldozers began working on suppression repairs to prevent potential erosion of land in the future.

On July 8, the number of personnel assigned to the fire had dropped to 872, and containment on the fire reached 80%. Water bars were also implemented to minimize potential damage in the aftermath of fire suppression efforts. By July 10, the fire had been 92% contained, and the number of personnel again dropped to 614. It was determined that the northern perimeter was the only portion of the fire's footprint that was still active. On July 13, the fire had reached 14,023 acres, its maximum size. Containment on the fire also reached 95%. By July 20, the fire was declared 100% contained.

== See also ==
- Park Fire
- Borel Fire
- 2024 Arizona wildfires
