= Crozier Fire =

2024 wildfire in Northern California

- Part of the 2024 California wildfires
- Date: August 6, 2024
- Location: El Dorado County, California
- Coordinates: 38.828576°N 120.697208°W

Statistics
- Perimeter: 91 percent contained
- Burned area: 1,938 acres (784 ha; 3 sq mi; 8 km^{2})

Impacts
- Deaths: 0
- Injuries: 0

Map
- The general location of the Crozier Fire's origin

The Crozier Fire was a fire in El Dorado County, California.

== See also ==
- 2024 California wildfires
- Mosquito Fire
- List of California wildfires
