= Corral Fire (2024) =

2024 wildfire in Northern California

- Part of the 2024 California wildfires
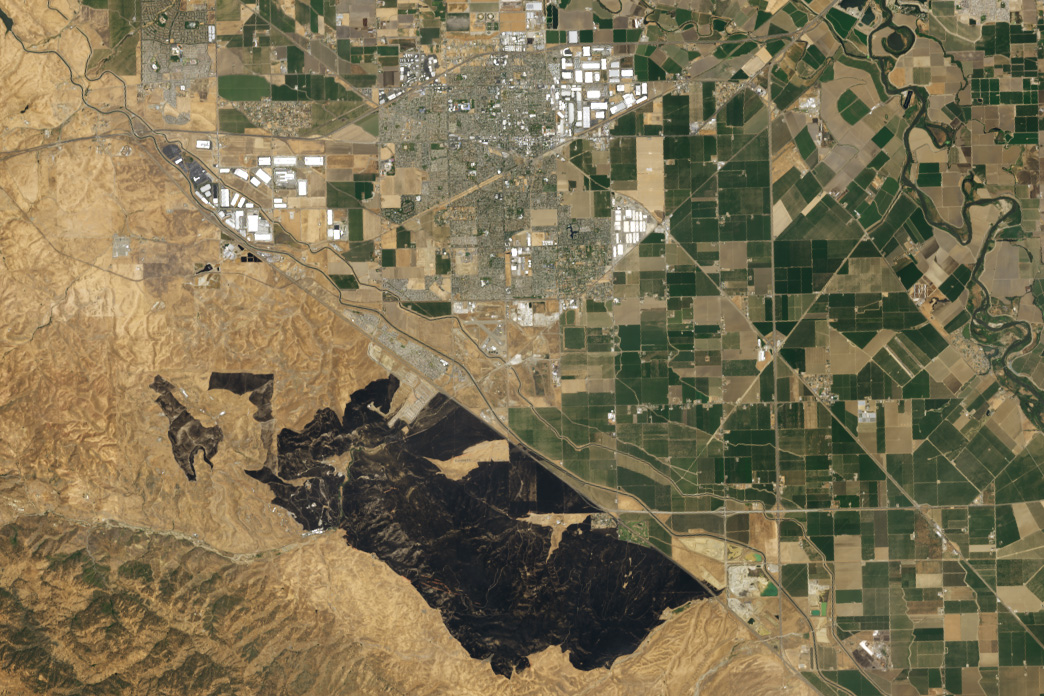
- The burn scar from the fire, as seen on June 2
- Date: June 1, 2024 –; June 6, 2024

Statistics
- Perimeter: 100% contained
- Burned area: 14,168 acres (5,734 ha; 22 sq mi; 57 km^{2})

Impacts
- Deaths: 0
- Injuries: 2 firefighters
- Structures destroyed: 1

Ignition
- Cause: Unknown

The Corral Fire was a sizeable wildfire that rapidly burned 14,168 acres south of Tracy in San Joaquin County in the U.S. state of California. It was active from June 1 to June 6, 2024, and was 100% contained as of August 2024. It was the first fire of the 2024 California wildfire season to burn more than 2,000 acres, and was the largest wildfire of the season until the Post Fire began 9 days after the Corral Fire was declared contained. The burn area contained Site 300, the only known remaining occurrence of large-flowered fiddleneck (amsinckia grandiflora) in the wild.

== Progression ==
The fire started at approximately 4:30 p.m., and had grown to 30 acres in size 14 minutes later, when it was first reported. By 7:50 p.m. the same day, the fire had rapidly grown to 4,940 acres, and was declared 10% contained. By 9:50 p.m. the fire had again grown to an estimated 10,000 acres. Containment had reached 13% by the end of the day, and the CAL FIRE Santa Clara Unit was assigned to the fire.

By 7:50 a.m. on June 2, two firefighters were injured and the fire had reached 12,500 acres. Containment had also reached 15% while 400 fire crews worked to contain the fire. At around noon the same day, the fire was determined to have been 30% contained. By 6:52 p.m., the fire had reached 14,168 acres, its maximum size. It was also determined that containment on the fire had reached 50%.

On the morning June 3, the fire was declared to have been 75% contained, and the number of fire crews assigned to the fire was increased from 400 to 475, including 16 bulldozers, 45 fire engines and 14 hand crews. Later, containment on the fire again jumped to 85%. A day later, on the morning of June 4, the fire had been declared 90% contained, and by the evening hours one structure had been destroyed, a home in a neighborhood near South Chrisman Road, south of the Interstate 580-State Route 132 interchange. Containment also reached 90% around the same time. The number of personnel assigned to the fire rapidly decreased, with only 20 active personnel by the end of June 4.

On June 5, the fire was declared 94% contained, and the number of personnel assigned to the fire again dropped to 10. At 8:05 a.m. on June 6, the fire was declared 98% contained, and at 6:02 p.m. the same day, the fire was declared 100% contained. The fire injured two firefighters, and cost an estimated $3.5 million (2024 USD) to suppress.

== Growth and containment table ==
Date	Area burned	Personnel	Containment
June 1	10,000 acres (40 km^{2})	Unknown	
June 2	14,168 acres (57 km^{2})	400	
June 3	14,168 acres (57 km^{2})	475	
June 4	14,168 acres (57 km^{2})	20	
June 5	14,168 acres (57 km^{2})	10	
June 6	14,168 acres (57 km^{2})	3	

== Misinformation by the Media ==
Initial reports of the cause said that four days prior, an incomplete controlled burn was done at Site 300. Those reports said that it could have caused the fire. Even if that was incorrect, they said that if the controlled burn was completed, it could've significantly reduced the damage the fire made. However, Alameda County Fire and LLNL officials say that the Corral Fire was unrelated to the prescribed burn. LLNL officials believe that the root cause was a failure of an aluminum hand tie on high voltage pole 8009, causing two overhead power lines to contact each other, causing a short circuit and sparks, causing the fire to ignite. The fire spread rapidly as gusts of up to 43 miles per hour (69 kilometers per hour) swept the north San Joaquin Valley.

== See also ==
- Park Fire
- 2024 California wildfires
- Durkee Fire
