= 2024 California wildfires =

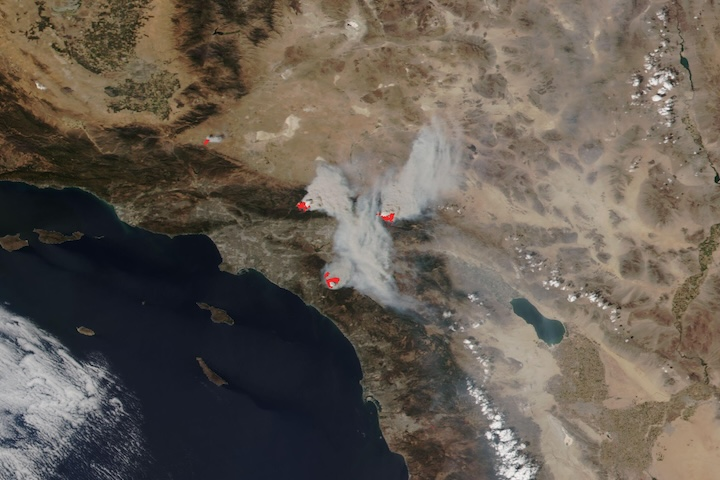
- A satellite view of the smoke plumes from the Bridge, Line, and Airport fires in Southern California on September 10, 2024

Statistics
- Total fires: 8,110
- Total area: 1,077,711 acres (436,134 ha)

Impacts
- Deaths: 1
- Structures destroyed: 1,837 (432 damaged)

Map
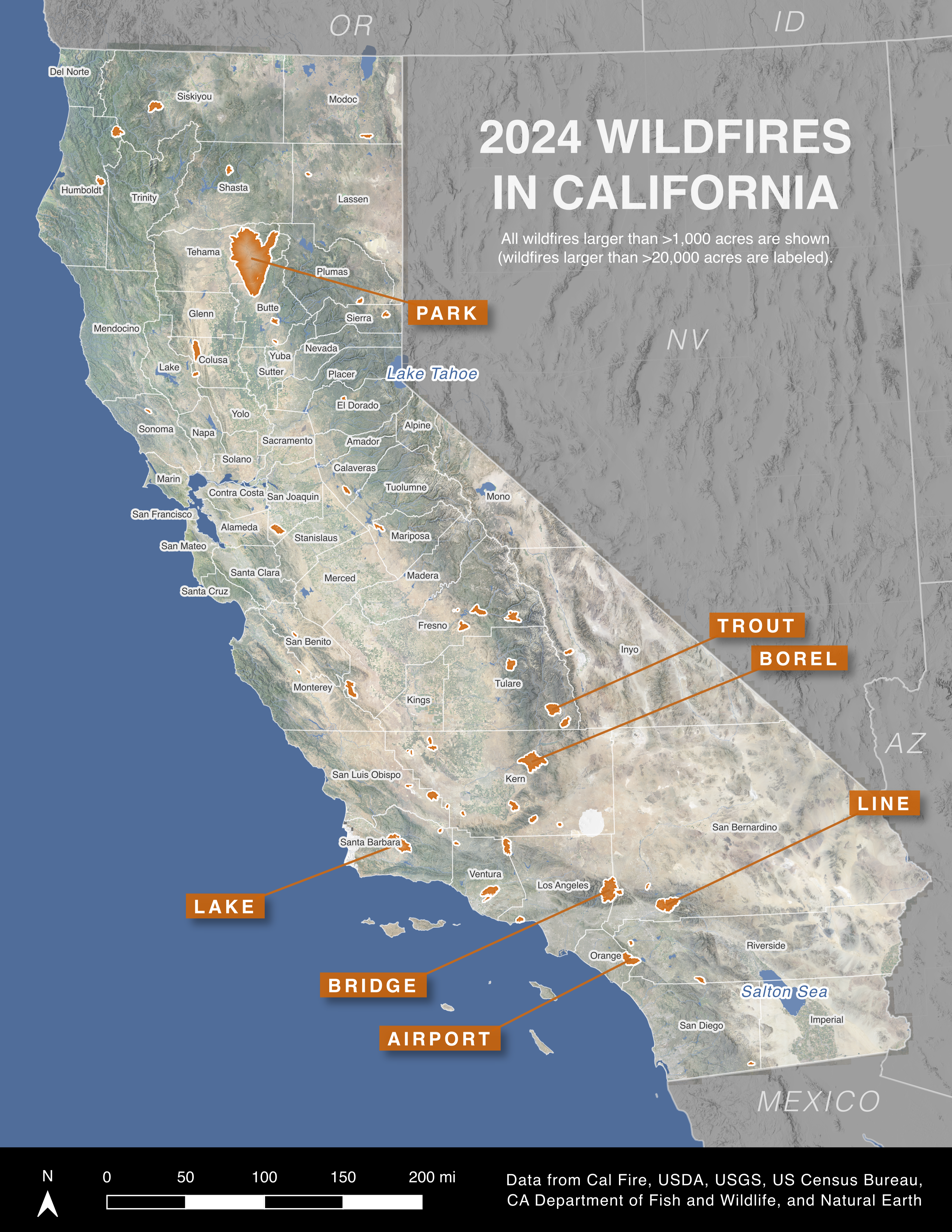
- A map of wildfires 1,000 acres or larger in California in 2024

In 2024, a total of 8,110 wildfires burned a cumulative 1,077,711 acres (436,134 ha) throughout the U.S. state of California. The total number of wildfires was slightly higher than the five-year average, while the total number of acres burned was lower. Wildfires destroyed a total of 1,837 structures and killed one person in the state in 2024. This season had the most burned acres since the 2021 wildfire season.

== Background ==
The timing of "fire season" in California is variable, depending on the amount of prior winter and spring precipitation, the frequency and severity of weather such as heat waves and wind events, and moisture content in vegetation. Northern California typically sees wildfire activity between late spring and early fall, peaking in the summer with hotter and drier conditions. Occasional cold frontal passages can bring wind and lightning. The timing of fire season in Southern California is similar, peaking between late spring and fall. The severity and duration of peak activity in either part of the state is modulated in part by weather events: downslope/offshore wind events can lead to critical fire weather, while onshore flow and Pacific weather systems can bring conditions that hamper wildfire growth.

== Summary ==
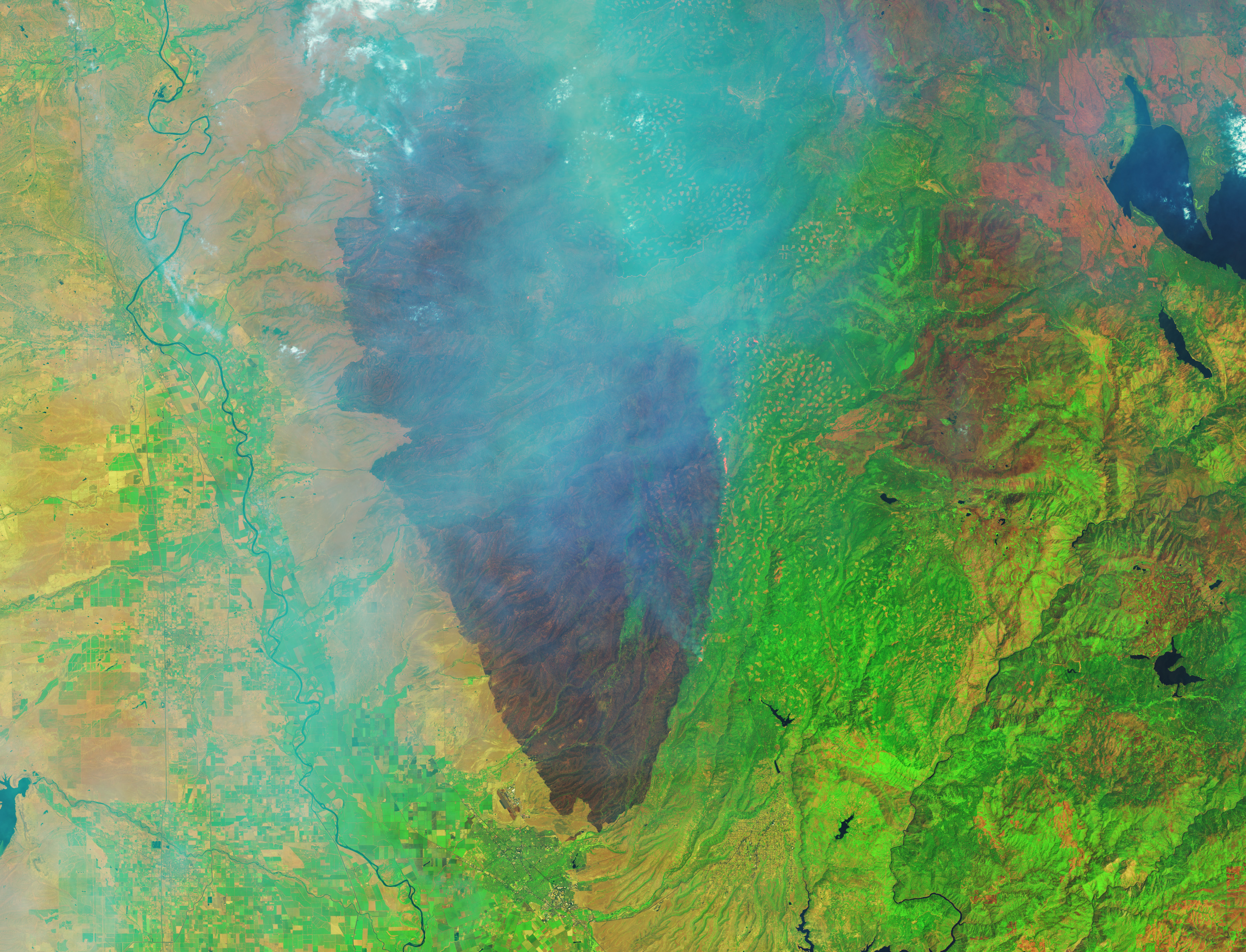
False-color view of the burned area and smoke from the Park Fire in Northern California, viewed from the Landsat 9 satellite on July 27, 2024

By the end of spring (June 20), the total area burned by wildfires in California was nearly 90,000 acres (36,000 ha). This early spike in activity was primarily from wind-driven grass fires, more than 30 of which occurred on several days in mid-June with low humidity, high temperatures, and strong winds.

The first and only wildfire fatality of the year in California occurred on July 8, when the Mina Fire burned a home. This makes the 2024 season have the lowest number of wildfire deaths in a season since 2013.

During late July, the total area burned during the 2024 wildfire season saw significant growth due in part to long periods of hot, dry weather. These conditions allowed several fires to grow rapidly in size, such as the Park Fire, in Butte and Tehama counties, and the Borel Fire, in Sequoia National Forest. By July 29, more than 726,000 acres (294,000 ha) had burned across the state.

Fire activity decreased during August, but a long period of extreme heat across the Western United States during early September allowed numerous wildfires across the state to grow rapidly, such as the Line Fire, the Bridge Fire, and the Airport Fire in Southern California. Later in September, fire activity again decreased due to improved fire weather.

While numerous storms in Northern California significantly slowed fire activity in November and December, dry conditions and multiple rounds of Santa Ana Winds led to multiple wildfires in Southern California, such as the Mountain and Franklin fires.

== List of wildfires ==
The following is a list of fires that burned more than 1,000 acres (400 ha), produced significant structural damage, or resulted in casualties.

Fires of more than 1,000 acres or that caused significant damage or casualties
Name	County	Acres	Start date	Containment date	Notes (Note: Containment means that fire crews have established and secured control lines around the fire's perimeter. These lines are artificial barriers, like trenches or cleared vegetation, designed to stop the fire's spread, or natural barriers like rivers. Containment reflects progress in managing the fire but does not necessarily mean the fire is starved of fuel, under control, or put out.)	Ref.
School	Kern	1,479	May 2	May 3		
Roberts	Monterey	7,030	May 17	May 25	Burned in Camp Roberts.	
Hill	Santa Barbara	1,383	May 28	June 1		
Firebaugh	Madera	1,300	May 30	May 30		
Corral	San Joaquin	14,168	June 1	June 6	Destroyed one home and injured two firefighters. Prompted highway closures and evacuation orders near Tracy.	
West	Kern	1,576	June 2	June 6		
Road	Kern	1,076	June 4	June 6		
Lost	Kern	3,281	June 6	June 11		
Bear	San Luis Obispo	1,410	June 12	June 14		
Junes	Butte	1,056	June 15	June 18	Destroyed one structure.	
Post	Los Angeles, Ventura	15,563	June 15	June 26	Began near Gorman, burned parallel to Interstate 5; caused the evacuation of ~1,200 people in nearby recreation areas. Destroyed one structure, injured one person.	
Hesperia	San Bernardino	1,078	June 15	June 24		
Point	Sonoma	1,207	June 16	June 24	Prompted evacuations of some 400 residents northwest of Dry Creek Valley. Caused one injury and destroyed three structures.	
Sites	Colusa	19,195	June 17	June 25		
Aero	Calaveras	5,285	June 17	June 27	Caused evacuations in both Calaveras and Tuolumne counties, damaged one structure and destroyed three.	
Apache	Butte	691	June 24	June 29	Prompted evacuations in Butte County. A firefighter was injured, and the fire destroyed 14 structures and damaged two.	
Fresno June Lightning Complex	Fresno	10,616	June 24	July 6	Consisted of the Flash, Bolt, Hog, and other fires. Ignited by lightning. Destroyed one structure.	
Basin	Fresno	14,023	June 26	July 20	Prompted evacuations in the Kirch Flat Campground and Balch Camp area.	
Mccain	San Diego	1,595	July 1	July 10	Prompted evacuations near Jacumba and caused one civilian injury.	
Thompson	Butte	3,789	July 2	July 8	Caused evacuations in parts of Oroville and Kelly Ridge. Destroyed 26 structures, damaged eight. Two people were injured. Started by arson.	
Airline	San Benito	1,295	July 2	July 5	Caused one injury.	
Shelly	Siskiyou	15,520	July 3	August 6	Eight firefighters were injured.	
Olive	Kern	1,310	July 3	July 5		
French	Mariposa	908	July 4	July 13	Destroyed 11 structures, damaged seven, and caused four injuries.	
Lake	Santa Barbara	38,664	July 5	August 4	Destroyed four structures, damaged one, and injured seven firefighters.	
North	Modoc	4,685	July 7	July 14		
Vista	San Bernardino	2,936	July 7	August 17	Caused the evacuation of the Mt. Baldy ski resort	
Mina	Mendocino	98	July 8	July 21	Resulted in one fatality and destroyed two structures.	
Hurricane	San Luis Obispo, Kern	12,703	July 13	July 17		
White	Kern	5,562	July 13	July 26		
SQF Lightning Complex	Tulare	33,026	July 13	September 17	Contained the Trout and Long fires. The Trout and Long fires burned within the Domeland Wilderness.	
Rancho	Kern	9,637	July 13	July 26		
Rim	Lassen	1,025	July 13	July 23		
Lost Hills	Kern	4,032	July 14	July 15	Crossed over and shut down a portion of Interstate 5 near Lost Hills.	
Hill	Humboldt	7,224	July 15	August 14	Caused 5 injuries	
Happy	Fresno	12,543	July 16	November 15	Burned in the Monarch Wilderness and Kings Canyon National Park. Started by lightning.	
Ridge	Lake, Colusa	2,756	July 20	July 29		
Eagle	Riverside	1,710	July 21	July 23		
Hawarden	Riverside	527	July 21	July 25	Destroyed seven homes and damaged eighteen more in Riverside. Started by fireworks.	
Gold Complex	Plumas	3,007	July 22	August 4	Comprised the Smith and Mill fires.	
Metz	Monterey	1,100	July 23	July 25		
Apache	Ventura	1,538	July 23	August 3		
Borel	Kern	59,288	July 24	September 15	Destroyed 223 structures and damaged 29. Prompted evacuations in Kern County and destroyed the historic community of Havilah.	
Park	Butte, Tehama	429,603	July 24	September 26	Fourth largest wildfire in California history. Destroyed 709 structures and damaged 54, including parts of the community of Cohasset, California. Started by arson.	
San Clemente Island	Los Angeles	13,000	July 24	July 30	Burned more than one-third of San Clemente Island, damaging electrical infrastructure for the naval base there.	
Nixon	Riverside, San Diego	5,222	July 29	August 7	Forced evacuations near Anza. Destroyed 23 structures and damaged three. Human caused.	
Pedro	Mariposa, Tuolumne	3,815	July 30	August 8	Destroyed two structures.	
Coffee Pot	Tulare	14,104	August 3	December 16	Burned in Sequoia National Park. Injured three firefighters. Started by lightning.	
Edgehill	San Bernardino	54	August 5	August 7	Destroyed six structures and damaged three.	
Crozier	El Dorado	1,938	August 6	August 20		
Boise	Humboldt, Siskiyou	12,967	August 9	September 20	Burned in Six Rivers and Klamath National Forests.	
Bear	Sierra	3,323	September 2	September 19		
Boone	Fresno, Monterey	17,600	September 3	September 13	Prompted evacuations in Fresno and Monterey Counties.	
Chimineas	San Luis Obispo	1,200	September 4	September 10		
Line	San Bernardino	43,978	September 5	December 23	Prompted evacuation orders in parts of Highland and the entire community of Running Springs. Destroyed one structure and injured six firefighters. Started by arson.	
Roblar	San Diego	1,000	September 7	September 11	Burned in Camp Pendleton.	
Boyles	Lake	81	September 8	September 11	Destroyed 33 residential structures and 80 vehicles in Clearlake.	
Bridge	Los Angeles, San Bernardino	56,030	September 8	November 26	Burned in the Angeles National Forest. Prompted evacuation orders for Wrightwood and Mount Baldy Village. Destroyed 81 structures and injured eight firefighters. Cause under investigation.	
Airport	Orange, Riverside	23,526	September 9	October 5	Began in Trabuco Canyon. Evacuations were along Ortega Highway and in surrounding areas. Destroyed 160 structures. Two civilians and 20 firefighters were injured. Started by equipment use.	
Shoe	Shasta	5,124	October 9	November 8	Burned in Shasta-Trinity National Forest. Injured one firefighter. Human-caused.	
Gabilan	Monterey	1,200	October 22	October 23	Burned in Fort Hunter Liggett.	
Horseshoe	Inyo	4,537	October 30	December 12	Began in Inyo National Forest. Was declared contained on November 14 before reigniting under strong winds late November 22. Destroyed two homes and six outbuildings.	
Mountain	Ventura	19,904	November 6	November 27	Destroyed 243 structures and damaged 127 near Camarillo. Injured five civilians and one firefighter.	
Franklin	Los Angeles	4,037	December 9	December 18	Destroyed 20 structures and damaged 28 in Malibu.	

Perimeters of 2024 California wildfires (map data)

== Gallery of maps ==
Maps of significant wildfires in 2024 in California

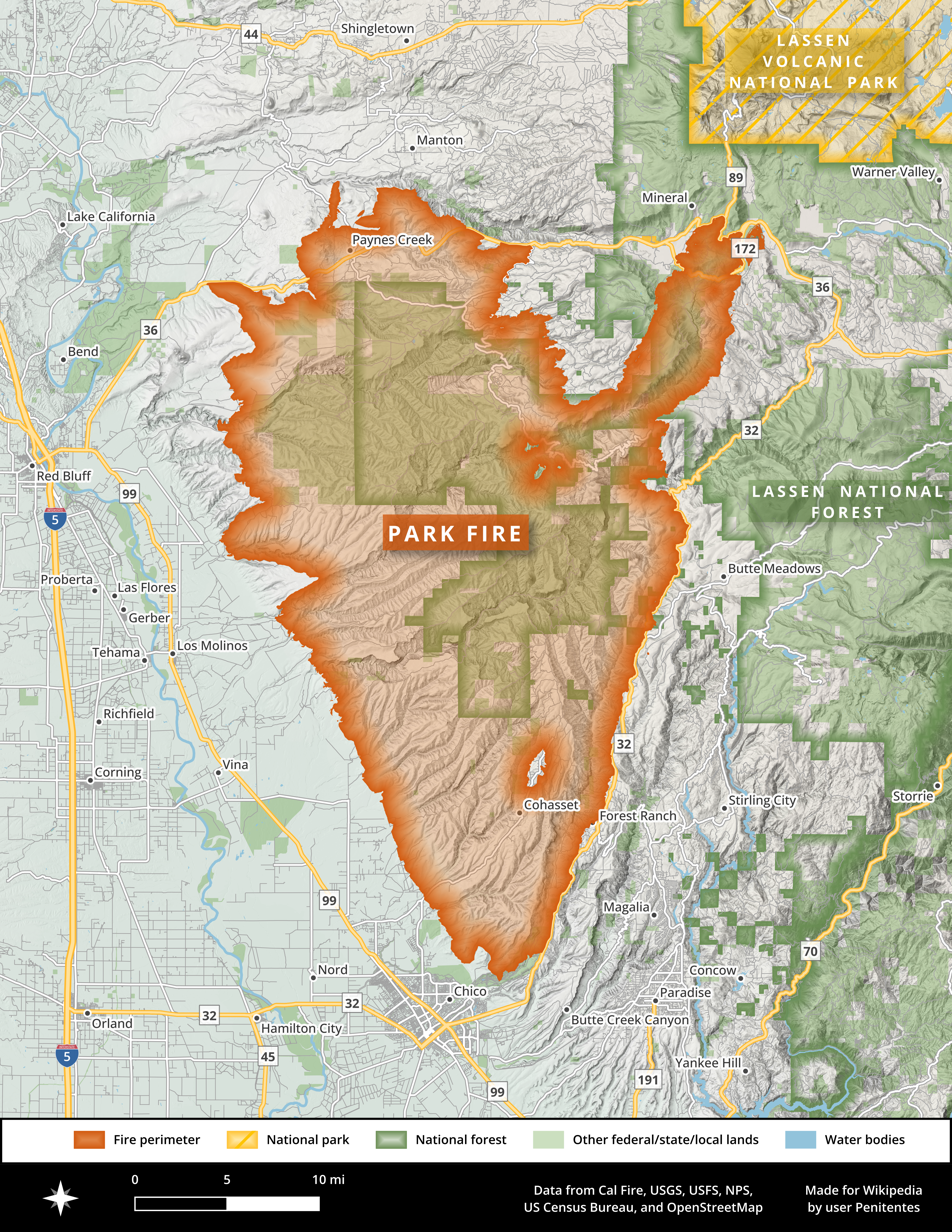
Park Fire

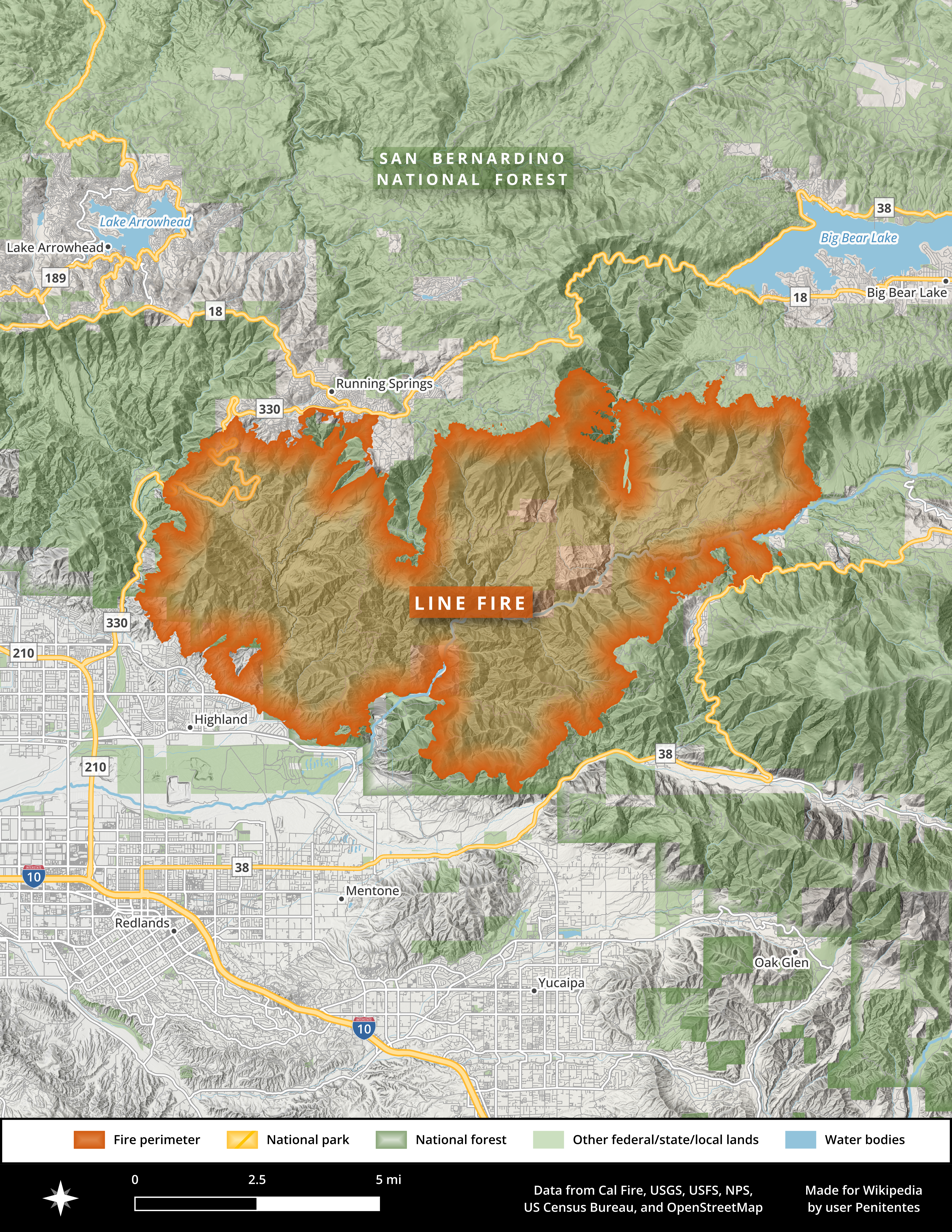
Line Fire

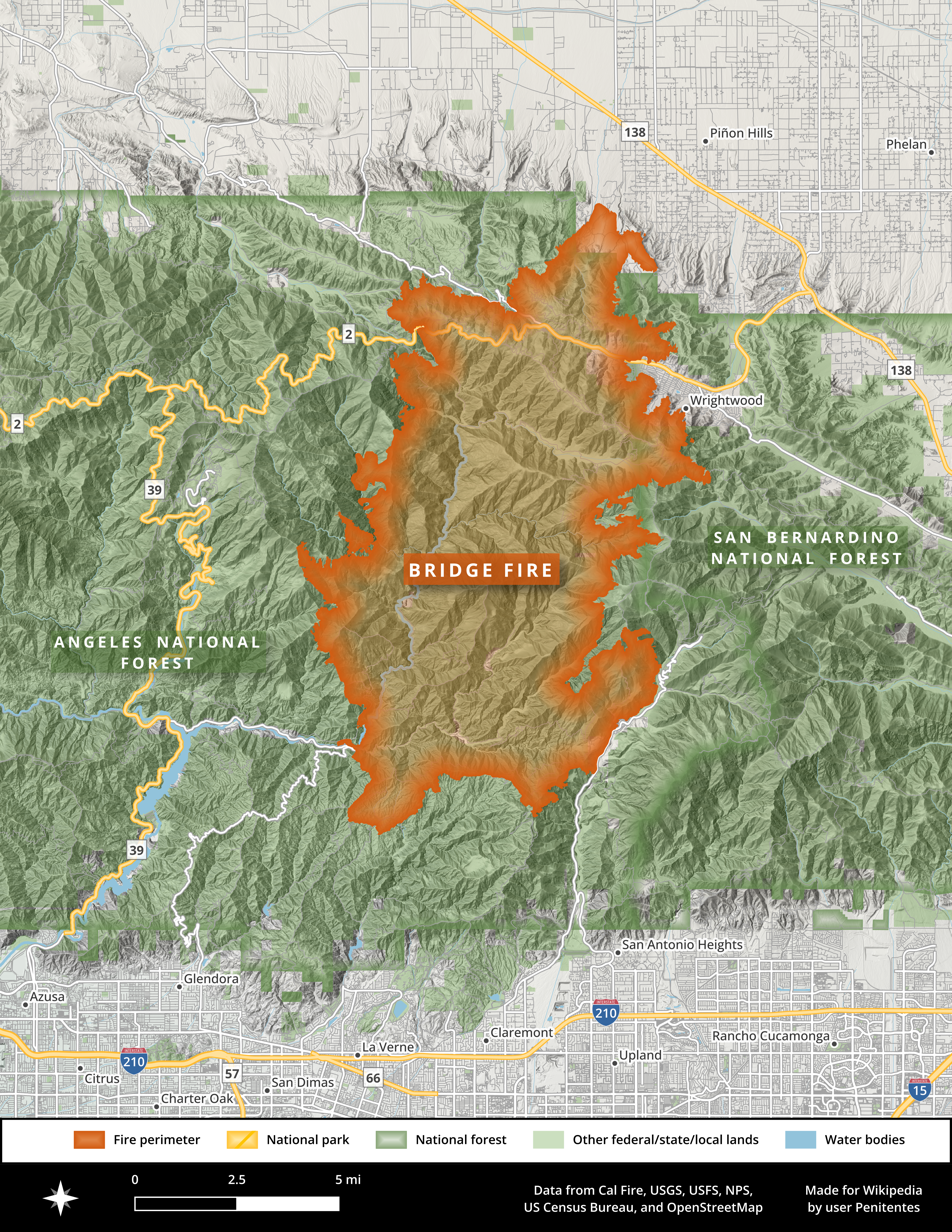
Bridge Fire

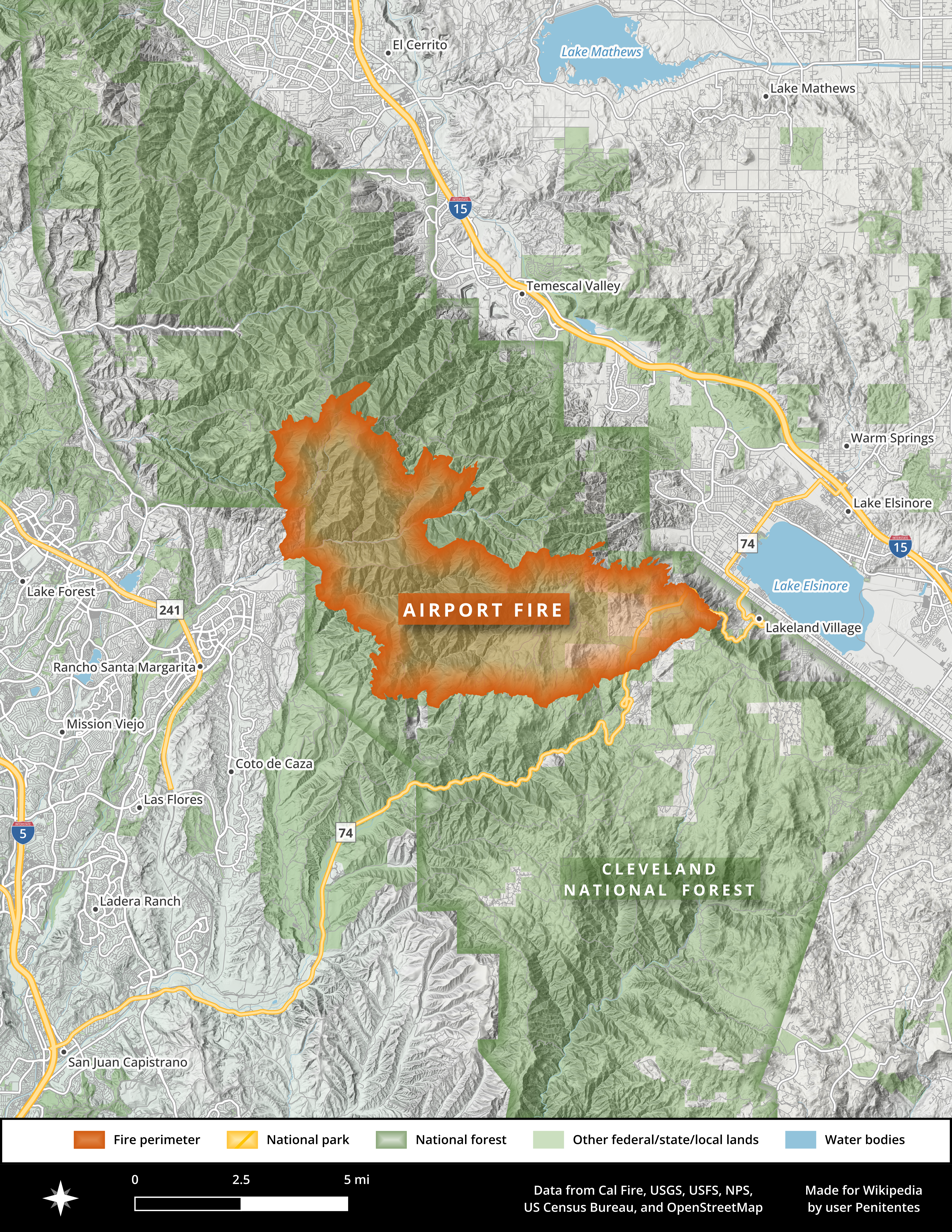
Airport Fire

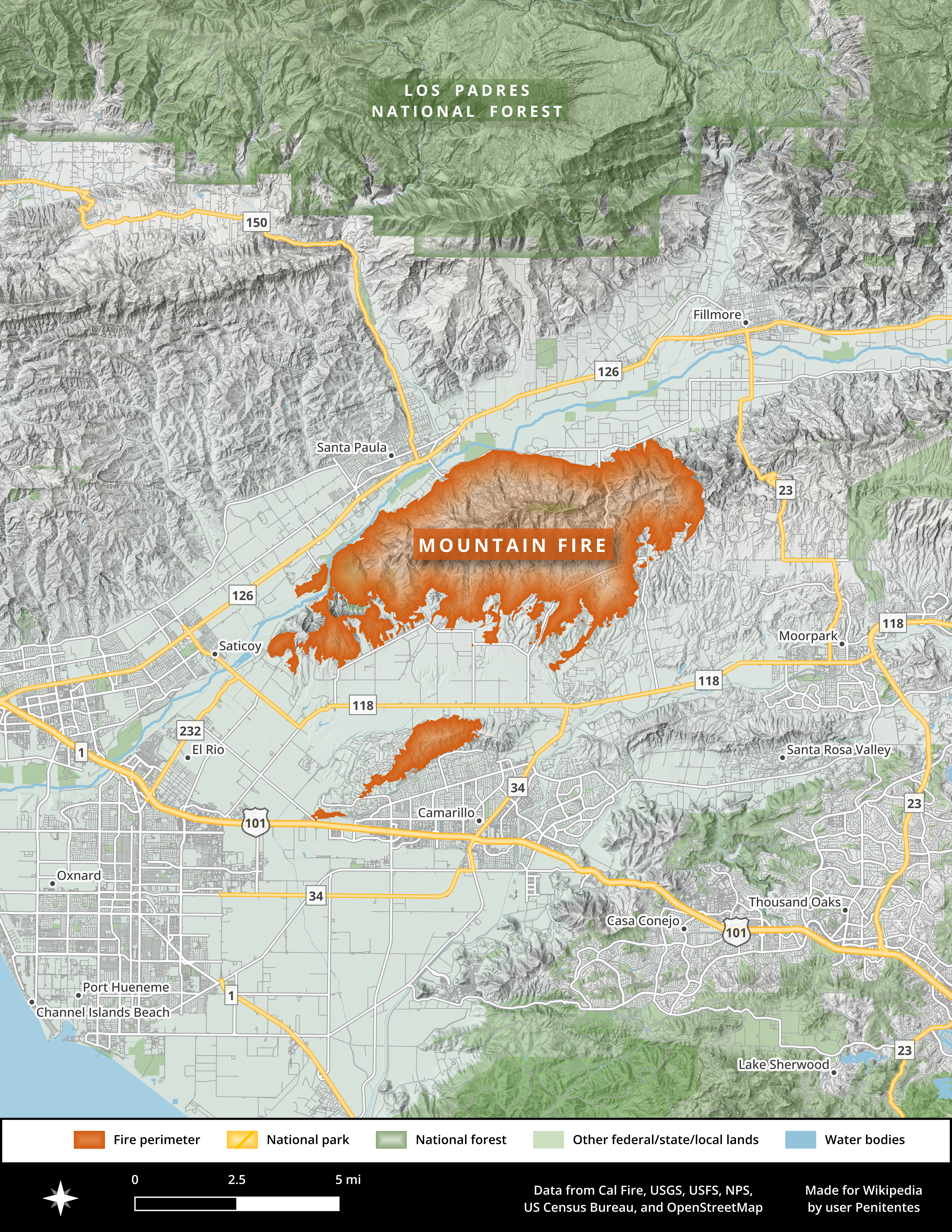
Mountain Fire

== See also ==
- 2024 United States wildfires
- 2024 Kern County wildfires
