= Franklin Fire =

2024 wildfire in Southern California

- Part of the 2024 California wildfires
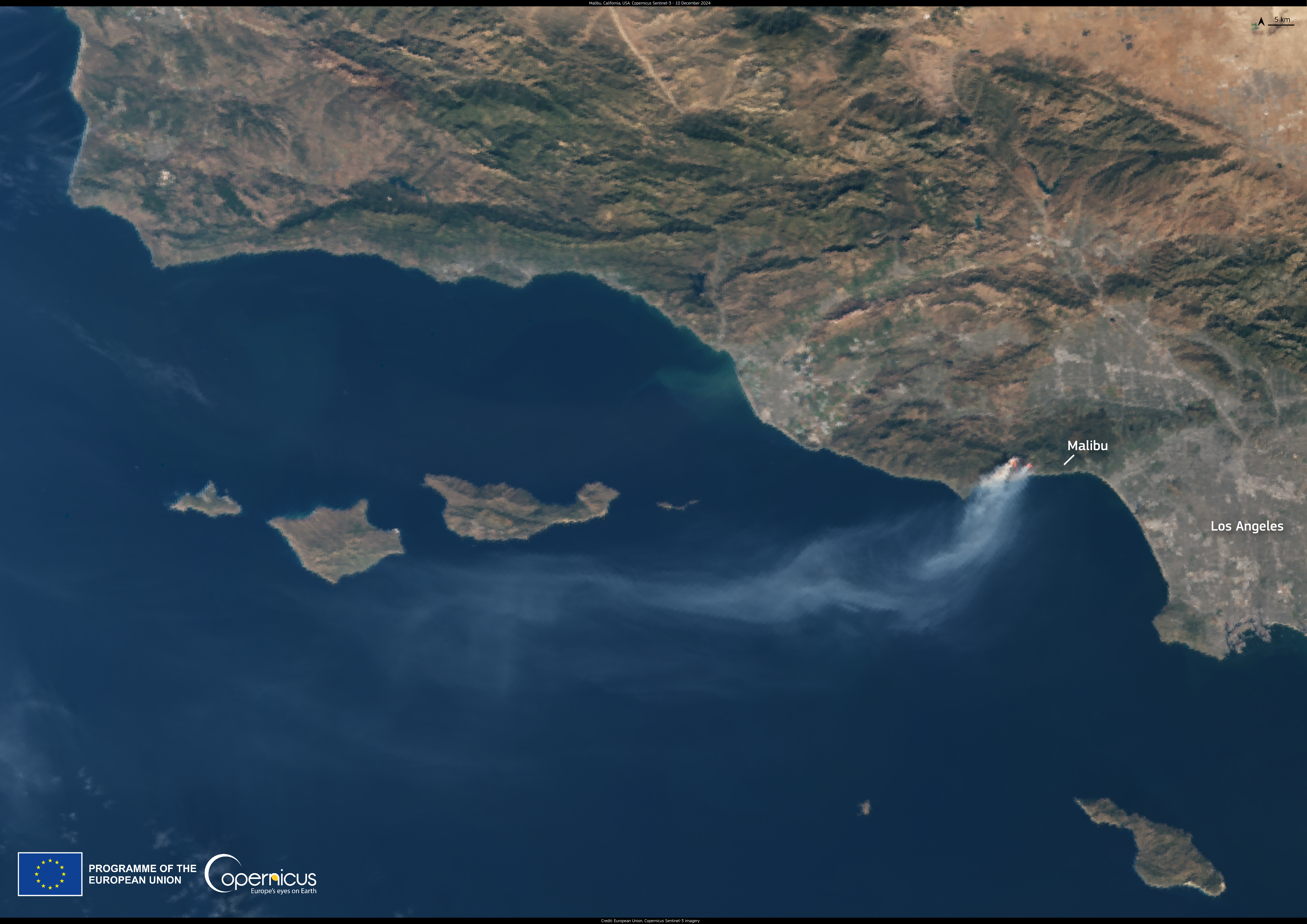
- Satellite image of the Fraklin Fire on December 13, 2024.
- Date: December 9, 2024 –; December 18, 2024; (9 days)
- Location: Los Angeles County, Southern California, United States
- Coordinates: 34.06343°N 118.69642°W

Statistics
- Burned area: 4,086 acres (1,654 ha; 6 sq mi; 17 km^{2})

Impacts
- Deaths: 0
- Injuries: 0
- Structures lost: 20 (28 damaged)

Ignition
- Cause: Under investigation

The Franklin Fire was a damaging wildfire that began in Los Angeles County, California during the 2024 California wildfire season. After igniting late on December 9, the fire quickly spread from strong Santa Ana winds and grew hundreds of acres that day. The fire burned 4,086 acres (1,654 ha), destroyed twenty structures, and damaged twenty-eight others. Note that the fire was reported to be 4,037 acres on December 18, but was revised later. The Franklin Fire was declared 100% contained on December 18.

== Background ==
The Franklin Fire ignited in the midst of strong Santa Ana winds, with winds over 50 miles (80 km) per hour, and during a dry spell, including humidity levels as low as 3%. Precipitation was late to come that year, and the dad low humidity dried out vegetation that fueled the Franklin Fire. These conditions were triggered by, and are becoming more common from, climate change.

== Progression ==
The fire ignited north of Pepperdine University, on Malibu Canyon Road, at approximately 10:50 p.m. on December 9, 2024. The fire sparked during a particularly dangerous situation and the quick spread was aided by dry brush.

The Franklin Fire was first reported as a 30 acres (12 ha) fire with potential to grow to 100 acres (40 ha). The fire had reached about 300 acres (120 ha) at around 1:00 a.m. and ran towards Pepperdine University. Students were first notified Pepperdine University began a shelter-in-place. At about 2:00 a.m., officials announced the closure of Pacific Coast Highway. By now, an emergency proclamation had been signed. At some point, the fire had tripled its size in one hour. The fire had been wind-driven by strong Santa Ana winds, resulting in a power outage in the area. Evacuations had been issued for parts of central and western Malibu, with extremely dangerous conditions from high winds and was at 2,592 acres (1,049 ha) and there had been large power shutoffs. The fire had jumped Pacific Coast Highway.

Because of the critical rate of spread and proximity to urban areas, approximately 1,700 firefighters from thirteen different agencies were responding to the Franklin Fire.

In the early hours of Wednesday, December 11, the fire increased from 2,862 acres (1,158 ha) to 3,049 acres (1,234 ha), and later to 4,000 acres (1,600 ha). However, officials announced the first bit of containment on the fire, 7%. After the fire had reached 30% containment the next day, the main focus was now repopulating evacuated areas and assessing damage. By December 13, all evacuations orders had been reduced to warnings and Pacific Coast Highway had completely reopened. Fire suppression efforts were aided by winds dying down, cooler weather, and increased humidity levels.

By December 15, the fire had reached 49% containment with minimal activity reported. Damage inspections were fully complete on December 16. Despite a red flag warning with winds gust up to 40–60 miles (64–97 km) per hour, the fire did not grow. Ultimately, the red flag warning was lifted three hours early when the strong winds died down earlier than expected. The fire reached full containment on December 18.

== Effects ==
The Franklin Fire destroyed 20 structures and damaged 28 in Malibu, California. There were power outages in Malibu and at Pepperdine University from emergency power shutoffs. Up to 40,000 customers were affected by the power shutoffs.

Several roads were closed as a result of the fire, including Pacific Coast Highway.

At Pepperdine University, final exams of the semester were cancelled or postponed. All schools in Malibu were closed on December 10. Malibu Elementary, Middle, and High Schools were closed during the fire, but reopened on December 16. Webster Elementary students attended classes at Malibu Elementary because there was fire damage to the roofs, solar panels, and some on-campus buildings. The school was properly cleaned and restored and reopened on January 6.

A smoke advisory was issued for northwestern Los Angeles County from December 11 - 12.

=== Evacuations ===
The Franklin Fire caused evacuations for the city of Malibu and surrounding areas. Students at Pepperdine University held a shelter-in-place. At the height of the Franklin Fire, about 20,000 people were under evacuation notices.

== Growth and containment table ==
Date	Area burned	Personnel	Containment	Ref.
December 9	30 acres (12 ha; 0.12 km^{2})	Unknown		
December 10	2,667 acres (1,079 ha; 10.79 km^{2})	1,500		
December 11	4,031 acres (1,631 ha; 16.31 km^{2})	1,974		
December 12	4,037 acres (1,634 ha; 16.34 km^{2})	1,708		
December 13	4,037 acres (1,634 ha; 16.34 km^{2})	1,764		
December 14	4,037 acres (1,634 ha; 16.34 km^{2})	1,305		
December 15	4,037 acres (1,634 ha; 16.34 km^{2})	1,230		
December 16	4,037 acres (1,634 ha; 16.34 km^{2})	1,155		
December 17	4,037 acres (1,634 ha; 16.34 km^{2})	819		
December 18	4,037 acres (1,634 ha; 16.34 km^{2})	. . .		

== See also ==
- Glossary of wildfire terms
- List of California wildfires
- 2024 California wildfires
