= 2024 Kern County wildfires =

Series of fires in California, United States

- Part of the 2024 California wildfires
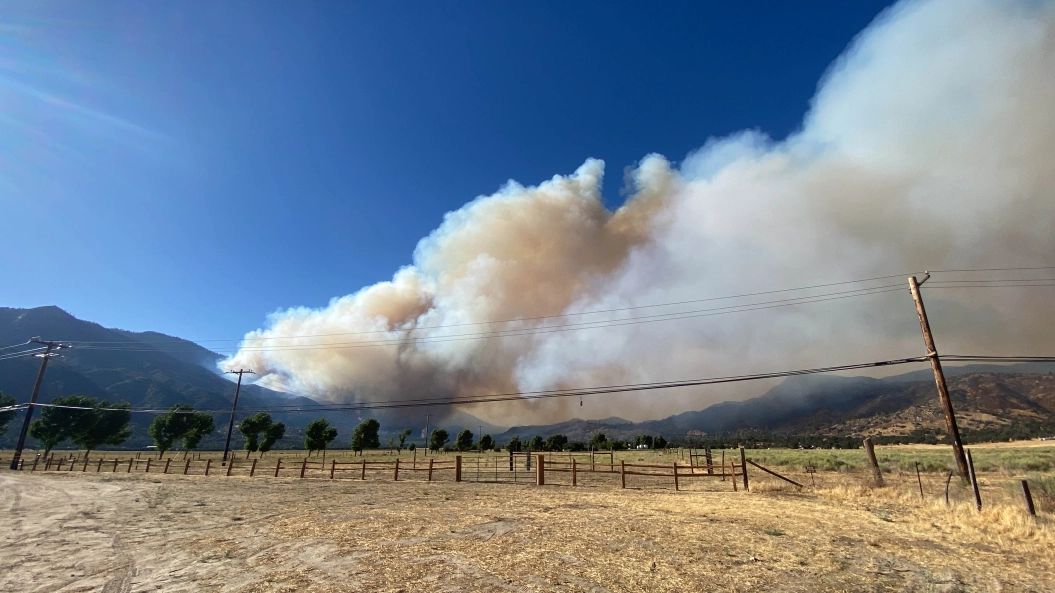
- The Borel Fire on July 29, 2024.
- Date: April 12 - present

Statistics
- Total area: >109,928 acres (44,486 ha)

Impacts
- Deaths: 0
- Structures lost: 223

The 2024 Kern County wildfires were series of major and non-major wildfires that burned in Kern County, California. The fires began in the month of April and ended in October. So far, in the year 2024, California saw one of its worse fire seasons in California compared to recent years. Due to the high amount of precipitation that had fallen the previous winter, there was an overabundance of dry fuels that make it easier for large fires to start. High winds were also present during the summer when fire season is mostly active in the state. This led to the wildfires in Kern County to be destructive and costly.

Out of all 58 of the counties in California, over 109,928 acres have burned so far in Kern County alone, which is about 10% of the acreage burned in California in 2024. The wildfires in Kern County have destroyed 223 structures and there are no reported deaths or injuries. In addition, the Borel Fire would become the largest wildfire in Kern County history, and the second largest wildfire in the 2024 California wildfire season.

== Background ==
The wildfire season in the U.S. state of California usually begins somewhere between May and June and typically ends between October and December. Because of the unusual amount of rainfall California previously obtained, this led them to an above average amount of dry fuels, which had not just affected Kern County, but most of the state of California. In the city of Bakersfield, California, they got approximately 2.22 inches of rain during the winter, which is about one inch above average, leading to much more fuel able to grow. The components of having plenty of fuel, high winds, and record-breaking heat led the way for 2024 being one of Kern County's worst fire seasons ever recorded.

== List of wildfires ==
The following is a list of fires that burned more than 50 acres (20 ha) in Kern County during 2024.

Name	Acres	Start date	Containment date	Notes	Ref
Gardner	254	April 12	April 12		
Burbank	62	April 12	April 12		
School	1,479	May 2	May 3	Fire sparked northwest of Wind Wolves Preserve.	
Sherwood	353	May 10	May 11		
Panama	79	May 10	May 10		
Cow	132	May 15	May 21	Burned in the Sequoia National Forest.	
Famoso	65	May 19	May 19		
Wind	121	May 20	May 20	Started east of Wind Wolves Preserve.	
Holiday	428	May 25	May 25	Burned in the Antelope Valley.	
Sherwood 2	162	May 25	May 25		
Twisselman	303	May 26	May 26		
Tule 2	52	May 27	May 28		
Panel	57	May 29	May 29		
Lake	180	May 30	May 31		
Red	98	May 31	June 28	Evacuated areas of Lake Isabella.	
Ranch	616	May 31	June 1	Started just north of Bakersfield.	
West	1,575	June 2	June 5	Fire sparked in the Antelope Valley, northwest of Rosamond.	
Shadow	86	June 3	June 6	Evacuated areas of Squirrel Mountain Valley.	
Morning	58	June 3	June 3	Burned in Bakersfield.	
Road	1,088	June 4	June 6	Burned southwest of Taft.	
Lost	3,600	June 6	June 11	Burned west of the Kern National Wildlife Refuge.	
Gaskell	403	June 6	June 6	Burned in the Antelope Valley.	
155	55	June 6	June 9	Evacuated areas of Wofford Heights.	
Cody	906	June 8	June 9		
Oil	73	June 11	June 11	Burned north of Bakersfield.	
James	141	June 11	June 11	Burned in Oildale.	
Five	197	June 14	June 14		
Quinn	70	June 15	June 15		
Sky	528	June 19	June 20		
Daytona	110	June 19	June 19	Burned in Bakersfield.	
10th	133	June 24	June 24	Burned just north of Edwards Air Force Base.	
Lavender	210	June 25	June 25		
Round	92	June 25	June 26	Started north of Bakersfield.	
El Paso	471	June 29	July 2	Burned southwest of Ridgecrest.	
Power	140	July 2	July 4	Burned in the Sequoia National Forest.	
Olive	1,310	July 3	July 5		
Berry	59	July 3	July 3		
Orchard	831	July 3	July 5	Evacuated areas of Tehachapi.	
Caliente	53	July 8	July 8		
Breckenridge	276	July 9	July 10		
Pilot	218	July 12	July 12	Started west of Bakersfield.	
Hurricane	12,703	July 13	July 17	Started in San Luis Obispo County, burned mostly in Kern County, South of McKittrick.	
White	5,646	July 13	July 26	Lightning-caused; the fire sparked evacuations for Twin Lakes.	
Rancho	9,950	July 13	July 26	Lightning-caused; started southeast of Arvin.	
Laura	77	July 14	July 19	Caused by lightning.	
Five	364	July 14	July 14		
Holloway	120	July 14	July 15		
Lost Hills	4,032	July 14	July 15	Burned north of Lost Hills. Crossed over Interstate 5 during strong winds.	
Five	348	July 15	July 15		
Willow	292	July 16	July 16		
Borel	59,288	July 24	September 15	Burned in the Sequoia National Forest. The fire was started by a fatal accident. The fire destroyed 223 structures and damaged 29. The fire destroyed the historic town of Havilah.	
Morning 7	56	July 26	July 26	Burned in Bakersfield.	
Sawmill	164	July 26	July 29	Burned in Wofford Heights and threatened structures.	
Pendulum	269	August 16	August 16	The fire impacted multiple houses in Bakersfield.	

== See also ==
- List of California wildfires
- 2024 California wildfires
- Park Fire
