= Horseshoe Fire =

2024 wildfire in California, USA

- Part of the 2024 California wildfires
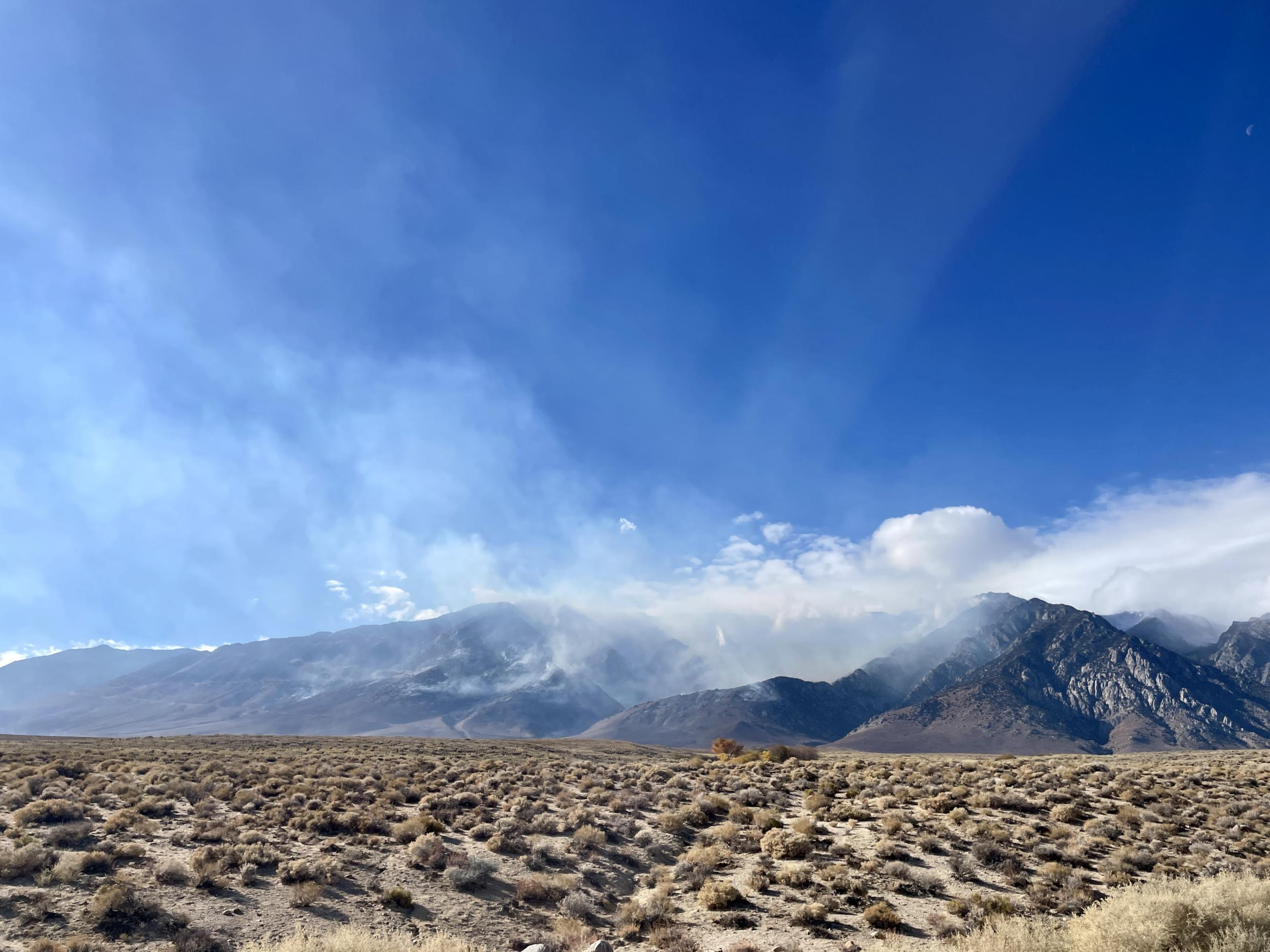
- The Horseshoe Fire as viewed on the morning of November 23, 2024.
- Date: October 30, 2024 –; December 12, 2024 (43 days)
- Location: Inyo County, California

Statistics
- Burned area: 4,537 acres (1,836 ha; 7 sq mi; 18 km^{2})

Impacts
- Deaths: 0
- Injuries: 0
- Structures lost: 8

Ignition
- Cause: Under investigation

The Horseshoe Fire was a wildfire that burned 4,537 acres (1,836 ha; 7 sq mi; 18 km^{2}) in Inyo County in California. The fire began on October 30, 2024, and the cause is currently under investigation. The fire prompted evacuations in multiple areas. The fire was contained on December 12, over a month after the fire began. The fire destroyed eight structures and damaged 3 others.

== Progression ==
The fire started near Horseshoe Meadows Road, southwest of Lone Pine at around 1:00 p.m. on October 30, 2024.

By November 10, the fire had reached 6.4 acres (2.6 ha) and remained 0% contained, due to steep, inaccessible terrain.

On November 14, the fire was marked 100% contained at 7 acres due to heavy rain and precipitation over the fire.

On the night of November 22, the fire flared up again due to high, erratic winds in the fire area and had grown to approximately 3,000 acres by November 23. By this time, evacuations were issued all the way up to Lone Pine.

The fire had slowed its rate of spread on November 23 and was receiving precipitation.

By November 25, the fire was marked over 60% contained at a mapped size of 4,529 acres (1,832 ha) and was 100% contained on December 12 at a final size of 4,537 acres (1,836 ha).

== Effects ==
The Horseshoe Fire prompted evacuations near Lone Pine, mostly in the Horseshoe Meadows area.

The fire destroyed two outbuildings and six structures and damaged three outbuildings.

Several roads were closed, including a portion of U.S. Route 395.

In severely burned areas and steep drainages, hazards of debris flow, flooding, and rockfall remained.

== Growth and containment table ==
Date	Area burned	Personnel	Containment	Ref.
November 7	10 acres (4.0 ha; 0.040 km^{2})	. . .		
. . .	. . .	. . .	. . .	
November 23	3,000 acres (1,200 ha; 12 km^{2})	700		
November 24	3,744 acres (1,515 ha; 15.15 km^{2})	732		
November 25	4,530 acres (1,830 ha; 18.3 km^{2})	600		
November 26	4,537 acres (1,836 ha; 18.36 km^{2})	96		
. . .	. . .	. . .	. . .	
December 12	4,537 acres (1,836 ha; 18.36 km^{2})	. . .		

== See also ==
- 2024 California wildfires
- Park Fire
- List of California wildfires
