= Thompson Fire =

2024 wildfire in Northern California, USA

- Part of the 2024 California wildfires
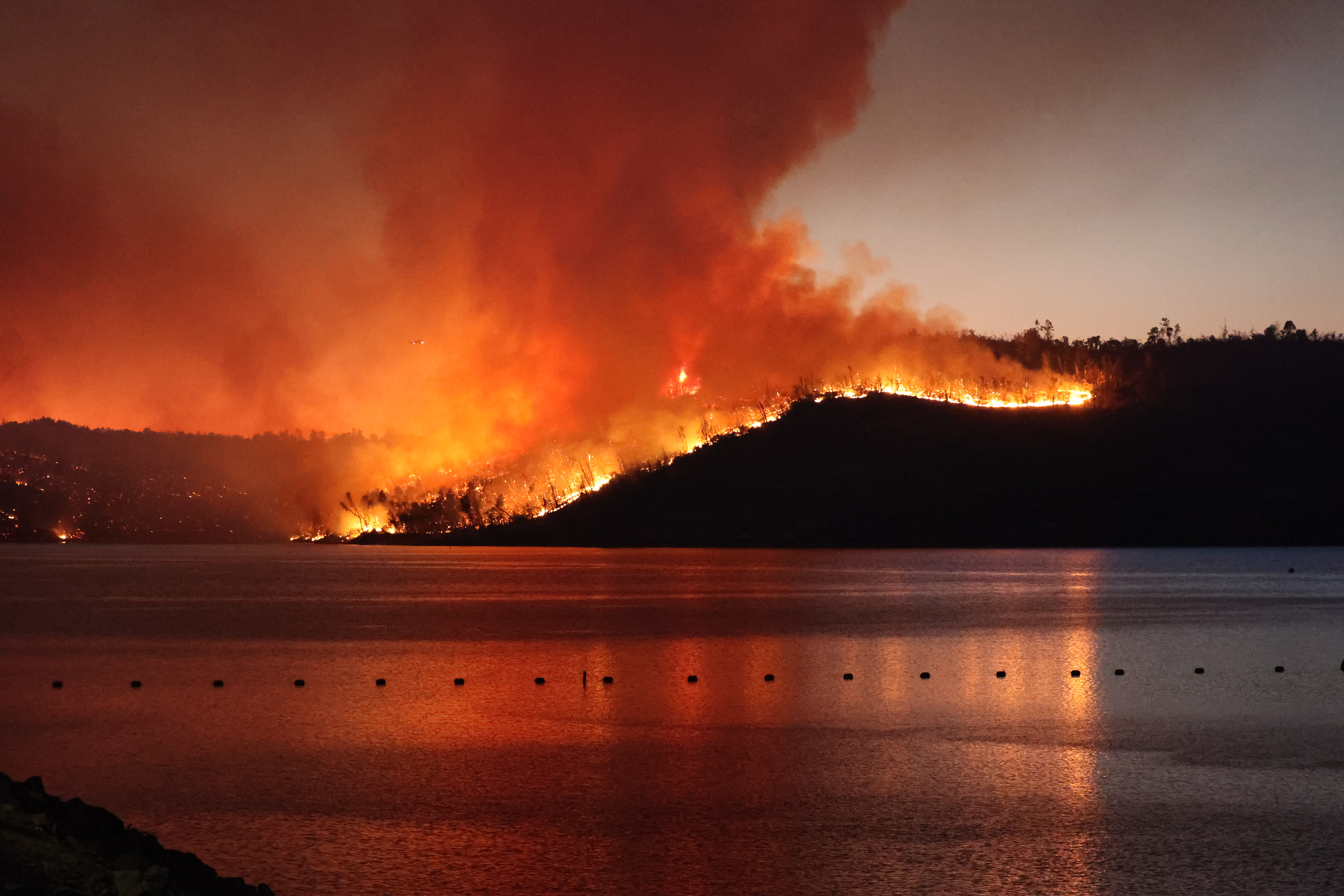
- The Thompson Fire as seen from Lake Oroville on July 2, 2024.
- Date: July 2, 2024 – July 8, 2024
- Location: Butte County, California, U.S.
- Coordinates: 39.53793°N 121.5467°W

Statistics
- Perimeter: 100% contained
- Burned area: 3,789 acres (1,533 ha)

Impacts
- Injuries: 4
- Evacuated: 29,000
- Structures lost: 26 (8 damaged)

Ignition
- Cause: Arson

Map
- Perimeter of the Thompson Fire (map data)
- Location of Thompson Fire in California

The Thompson Fire was a fast-moving wildfire burning near the community of Oroville in Butte County, California, during the 2024 California wildfire season.

== Background ==
The Thompson Fire sparked amidst a heat wave described as "exceptionally dangerous and lethal" by the National Weather Service. The fire was allegedly caused by arson, with a man testing fireworks by throwing one out of the window. An arrest was made on August 22. The heat wave had caused vegetation to dry out, increasing wildfire risk in the area.

The community of Oroville has been affected by several major wildfires, including the Camp Fire in 2018 and the Bear Fire in 2020.

== Fire ==
The fire sparked at 10:51 a.m. on Tuesday, July 2, 2024, near Cherokee Road and Thompson Flat Cemetery Road. Within six hours, the fire grew from 15 acres (6.1 ha) to over 2,100 acres (850 ha), causing Gavin Newsom, the Governor of California, declared a state of emergency in Butte County. 13 thousand residents of Oroville were evacuated from the area.

On Wednesday, the fire had scorched more than 3,000 acres (1,200 ha). It was originally reported that eight firefighters were injured, three in a car crash and four were heat-related. However, that number had dropped to four on Thursday. Four structures were also destroyed.

By Thursday, it was reported that growth of the fire had slowed, partly due to winds that were fueling the fire dying down.

== Growth and containment status ==
Fire containment status Gray: contained; Red: active; %: percent contained
Date	Total area burned	Personnel	Containment
Jul 2	2,135 acres (864 ha)	514 personnel	
Jul 3	3,002 acres (1,215 ha)	1,438 personnel	
Jul 4	3,789 acres (1,533 ha)	2,219 personnel	
Jul 5	3,789 acres (1,533 ha)	1,930 personnel	
Jul 6	3,789 acres (1,533 ha)	1,728 personnel	
Jul 7	3,789 acres (1,533 ha)	1,185 personnel	
Jul 8	3,789 acres (1,533 ha)	6 personnel	
