= Mountain Fire (2024) =

2024 wildfire in Southern California

- Part of the 2024 California wildfires
- GOES-18 loop of the fire on November 6th
- Date: November 6 –; November 27, 2024; (22 days)
- Location: Ventura County, Southern California, United States
- Coordinates: 34.318°N 118.968°W

Statistics
- Burned area: 19,904 acres (8,055 ha; 31 sq mi; 81 km^{2})

Impacts
- Injuries: 10 (≥6 civilians, ≥1 firefighter)
- Structures lost: 243 destroyed, 127 damaged

Ignition
- Cause: Rekindling of earlier wildfire

Map
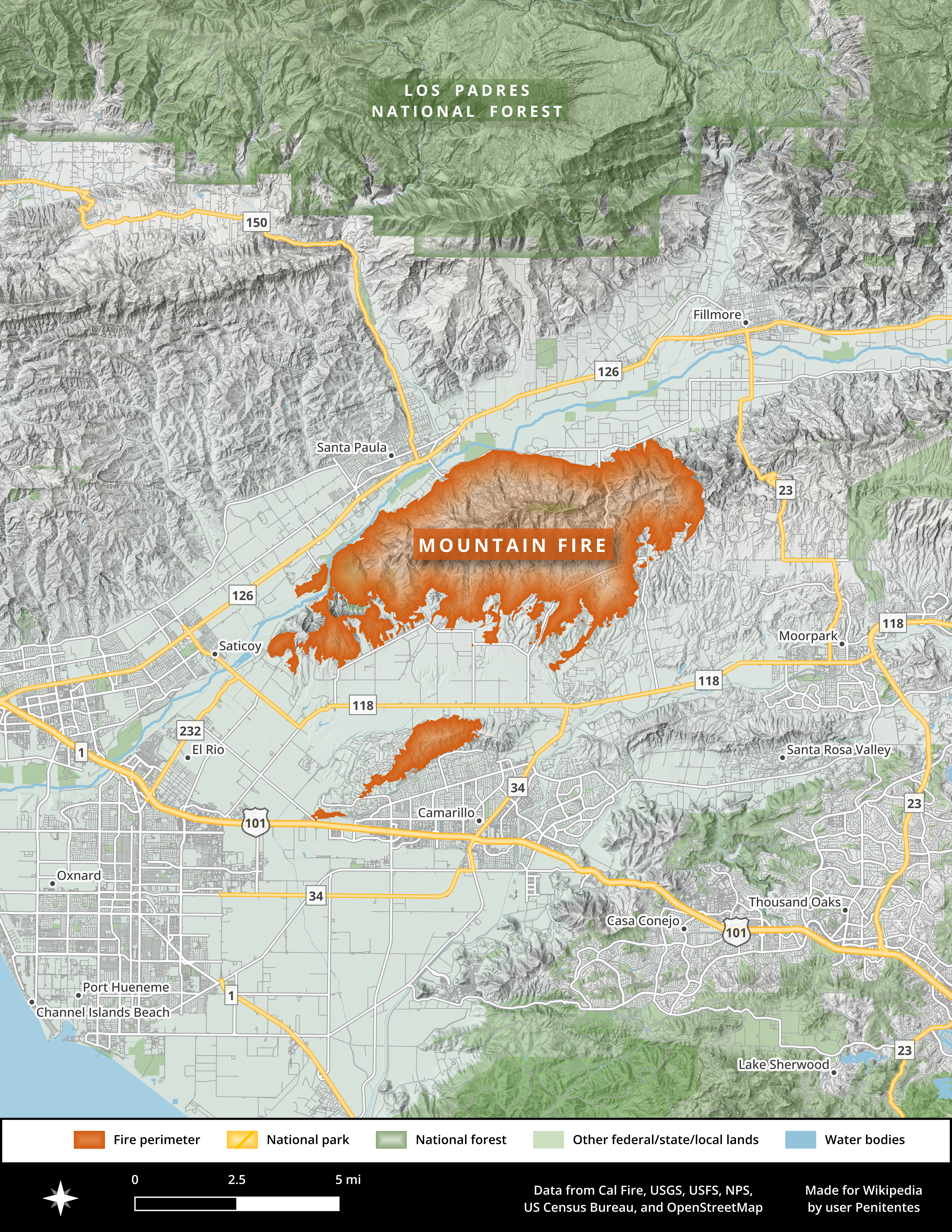
- The footprint of the Mountain Fire

The Mountain Fire was a destructive and fast-moving wildfire in Ventura County, Southern California, in November 2024. The fire burned 19,904 acres (8,055 hectares), destroyed and damaged hundreds of buildings, and caused multiple injuries.

== Background ==
The Mountain Fire began shortly before 9:00 a.m. PST on November 6 during an episode of strong Santa Ana winds in Southern California. The National Weather Service's Storm Prediction Center delineated an "extremely critical" risk area on their Day 1 fire weather outlook, warning of low relative humidity values combined with a strong wind event with gusts of over 65 miles per hour (105 km/h). The National Weather Service office in Los Angeles issued a 'particularly dangerous situation' red flag warning for November 6–7 in the area; it was the first such issuance in the Los Angeles area since 2020. The Los Angeles Times called it "the most extreme Santa Ana wind event to hit Southern California in years".

== Progression ==
The fire was first reported at 8:50 a.m. PST "near the 7900 block of Balcom Canyon Road and Bradley Road", according to CBS News and the Ventura County Fire Department, in a remote area north of the community of Somis. The fire grew to approximately 1,000 acres (400 ha) in the hour after its ignition. At approximately 11:00 a.m., the fire crossed State Route 118 and began to impinge on the Camarillo Heights neighborhood.

KTLA reporter Sara Welch reported that "winds are so fierce that they can’t get any fixed-wing aircraft up there to drop any water".

Evacuation orders were issued for parts of Ventura County. By November 7, CNN reported that 14,000 residents of Ventura County had received evacuation notices.

On November 27, three weeks after it first began, the Mountain Fire reached 100 percent containment.

== Effects ==
At least ten people were injured—including at least one firefighter and six civilians—and two of those people were hospitalized. Some of the injuries were due to smoke inhalation.

The fire destroyed 243 structures and damaged another 127. Of those, at least 83 were homes in Camarillo Heights. Approximately 12,000 acres (4,900 ha) of farmland were impacted by the fire. Besides the homes, outbuildings, fences, irrigation lines, and other farming equipment, the fire damaged or destroyed avocado, citrus and berry crops.

Many schools in Ventura County were closed on Thursday, November 7, due to the fire.

== Investigations ==
An investigation determined that a week before the Mountain fire started on November 6, 2024, a tractor clearing brush had started a wildfire. While the fire was limited to 1.8 acres (0.73 ha), a hotspot was detected the next day near the tractor's wheel. When the Santa Ana winds began to blow the following week, the fire rekindled.

== Growth and containment table ==
Date	Area burned	Personnel	Containment
November 6	1,500 acres (610 ha; 6.1 km^{2})	. . .	
November 7	20,485 acres (8,290 ha; 82.90 km^{2})	2,420	
November 8	20,630 acres (8,350 ha; 83.5 km^{2})	2,999	
November 9	20,630 acres (8,350 ha; 83.5 km^{2})	2,999	
November 10	20,630 acres (8,350 ha; 83.5 km^{2})	2,812	
November 11	20,630 acres (8,350 ha; 83.5 km^{2})	2,399	
November 12	20,630 acres (8,350 ha; 83.5 km^{2})	2,399	
November 13	20,630 acres (8,350 ha; 83.5 km^{2})	1,487	
November 14	19,904 acres (8,055 ha; 80.55 km^{2})	1,146	
November 15	19,904 acres (8,055 ha; 80.55 km^{2})	140	
November 16	19,904 acres (8,055 ha; 80.55 km^{2})	66	
November 17	19,904 acres (8,055 ha; 80.55 km^{2})	. . .	
November 18	19,904 acres (8,055 ha; 80.55 km^{2})	. . .	
. . .	. . .	. . .	. . .
November 22	19,904 acres (8,055 ha; 80.55 km^{2})	. . .	
. . .	. . .	. . .	. . .
November 27	19,904 acres (8,055 ha; 80.55 km^{2})	. . .	

== See also ==
- Glossary of wildfire terms
- List of California wildfires
- Maria Fire
