= Point Fire =

2024 wildfire in Northern California, USA

- Part of the 2024 California wildfires
- Date: June 16, 2024 – June 24, 2024
- Location: Sonoma County, California
- Coordinates: 38.705475°N 123.012253°W

Statistics
- Burned area: 1,207 acres (488 ha)

Impacts
- Injuries: 1
- Structures lost: 4 (10 damaged)

Ignition
- Cause: Undetermined

Map
- Perimeter of Point Fire (map data)
- The fire's location in northern California

The Point Fire was a wildfire that burned near Healdsburg in Sonoma County, California in the United States. The fire burned 1,207 acres of wildland and wineries after igniting on June 16, 2024, amid red flag conditions that plagued much of the area at the time of the fire. The fire was fully contained eight days later on June 24, 2024.

== Background ==
The Point Fire burned in Sonoma County which has a prolific history of significant wildfire activity. Some most notable incidents near the location of the Point Fire have been the Tubbs and Kincade fires of October 2017 & 2019 respectively. In August 2020, the Walbridge Fire of the LNU Lightning Complex burned close to the footprint of the Point Fire. Additionally, there was the Glass Fire which burned in September of that same year. However, the land which inhabits the immediate footprint of the Point Fire had reportly not burned from a significant wildfire since 1972.

== Progression ==
The fire, dubbed the Point Fire after its ignition along Stewarts Point-Scaggs Springs Road, was first reported at 12:30 p.m. PDT on Sunday, June 16 and quickly spread to the rolling hillsides near Marina Road in Healdsburg. The fire grew quickly amid afternoon heat and gusting winds that were estimated to be at least 28 mph in the area.

Within hours, a mandatory evacuation was issued by the Sonoma County Sheriff's Office for all residents northwest of Dry Creek Valley, displacing more than 400 people. As much as 4,000 others were placed under an evacuation warning. By 6:30 pm the fire had ballooned to 550 acres and was torching along Bradford Mountain with only 15% containment. By this time, over 400 firefighting personnel were on scene combatting the fire.

On June 24th, the fire was declared to be 100% contained.

== See also ==
- 2024 California wildfires
