= Post Fire =

2024 wildfire in Southern California, USA

- Part of the 2024 California wildfires
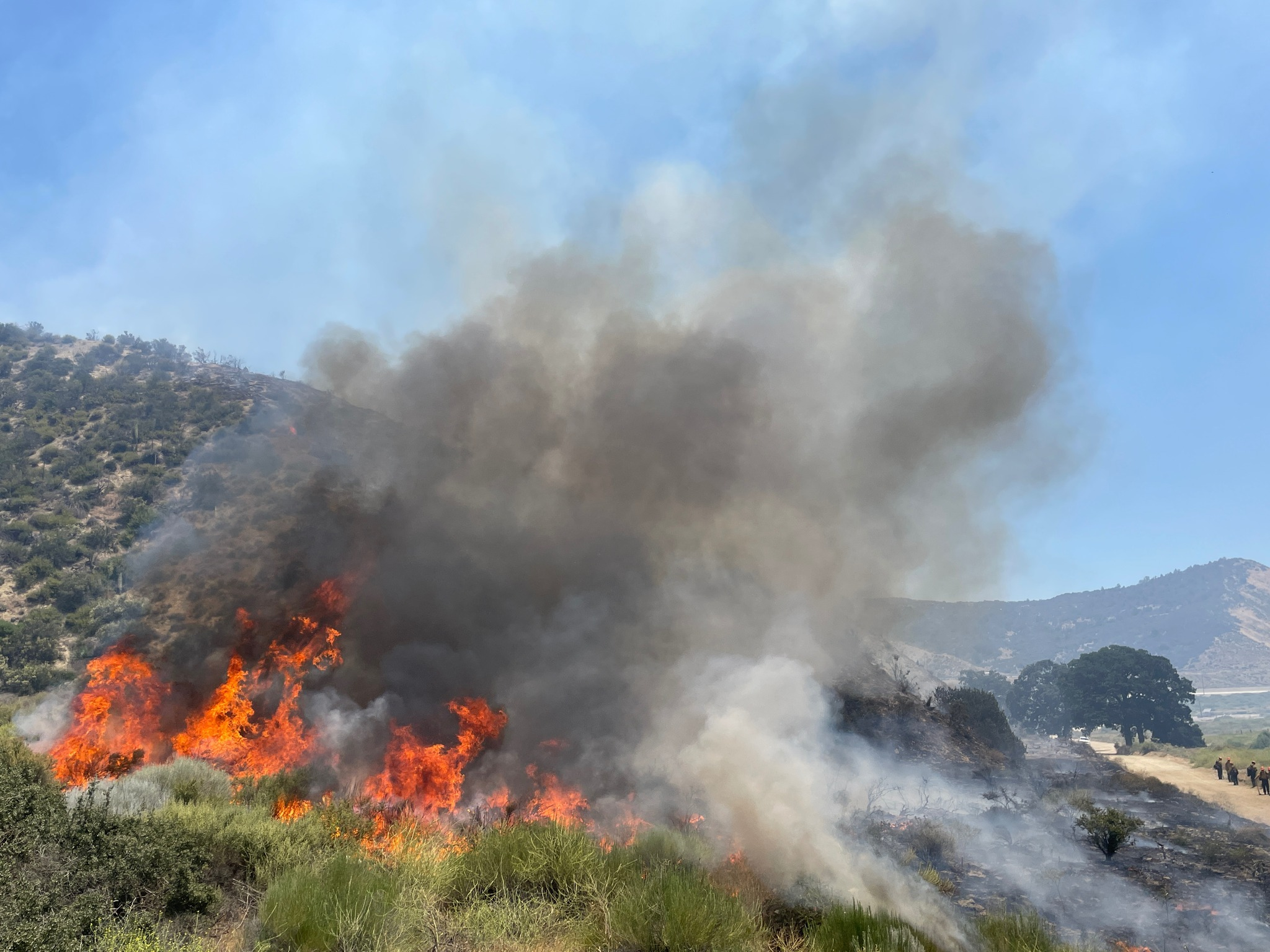
- Flames from the frontlines of the Post Fire on Sunday, June 16, 2024.
- Date: June 15, 2024 –; June 26, 2024
- Location: Gorman, Los Angeles County, California
- Coordinates: 34.79208°N 118.8521°W

Statistics
- Burned area: 15,610 acres (63.2 km^{2}; 24.39 sq mi)

Impacts
- Injuries: 1
- Structures lost: 1

Ignition
- Cause: Under investigation

Map
- Perimeter of the Post Fire (map data)
- The location of the Post Fire, in south Central Valley

The Post Fire was a large wildfire that burned southwest of Gorman and Lebec along Interstate 5 in Los Angeles County, California in the United States. Igniting on Saturday, June 15, 2024, at Ralph's Ranch and Gorman Post Road alongside Interstate 5, the fire grew rapidly due to anticipated windy red flag conditions that had persisted in much of California through that weekend. The fire eventually ballooned to an estimated 15,563 acres (6,298 ha) and destroyed one structure, burning much of its acreage in the Hungry Valley State Vehicular Recreation Area. It involved portions of two counties, Los Angeles County and Ventura County, and was declared contained after burning for 11 days.

== Background ==
The area in which the Post Fire had burned has been known for its fire activity of varying sizes in acreage throughout the years and most notably was the location of the 2006 Day Fire which was once one of the largest wildfires in California history.

== Progression ==
Reported at approximately 1:45 pm PDT on June 15, near southbound Interstate 5 and Gorman Post Road near the borders of Kern and Ventura counties, the Post Fire grew explosively due to its alignment with prevailing winds out of the northeast that persisted throughout the day. An evacuation order was soon placed for the entire Hungry Valley State Vehicular Recreation Area as the fire rapidly expanded south paralleling Interstate 5, blackening several thousand acres in several hours.

By 7:15 pm that day, the fire had burned up to 4,000 acres and was zero percent contained, while over 1,200 people were placed under a mandatory evacuation from the Hungry Valley State Vehicular Recreation Area campground and the nearby community of Gorman. By this time, over 300 firefighting personnel were engaging the fire.

Despite the fire rapidly growing parallel to Interstate 5, only the southbound lanes of the thoroughfare were closed during much of the fire's activity, while the northbound lanes remained open. However, the Gorman exits of the freeway near the point of the fire's original were closed. By late Saturday, the fire had been estimated to be 10,000 acres in size and had prompted further evacuations for the Pyramid Lake area.

By early Sunday, June 16, the fire had expanded to roughly 12,200 acres and was only 2% contained. The prevailing winds persisted throughout the weekend, hampering firefighting efforts. Despite the large number of persons evacuated, the fire was largely burning in the unincorporated wilderness west of Pyramid Lake for much of the day. The oppressive winds brought much of the active fireline southward, entering Ventura County and burning an additional 2,000 acres of the Los Padres National Forest. By Sunday evening, the fire had been estimated to be at 14,625 acres in size and containment rose to 8%.

By Tuesday June 18, the fire was reported as 24% contained. More than 1000 firefighters were assigned to battle the blaze, particularly near the Pyramid Lake recreation area as fire activity had significantly decreased in spite of warm and windy conditions. As of Friday, June 21, the fire was described as 61% contained, affecting 15,690 acres. Hot and breezy conditions were expected over the weekend. On Sunday June 23, the fire was reported to be 83% contained with the fire size holding steady. All evacuation orders and warnings remained in place. Authorities reported that two structures have been destroyed and one person was injured.

On Monday June 24, the fire in the Gorman area was 90% contained, allowing residents to return to their homes. Fire crews were reduced to fewer than 600 firefighters, mostly protecting critical infrastructure and recreation areas.

On Wednesday, June 26, the Post Fire was 100% contained after being active for over 11 days. The cause is under investigation.

== See also ==
- 2024 California wildfires
- Hughes Fire
