= Domeland Wilderness =

Protected wilderness area in California, United States

- IUCN category Ib (wilderness area)
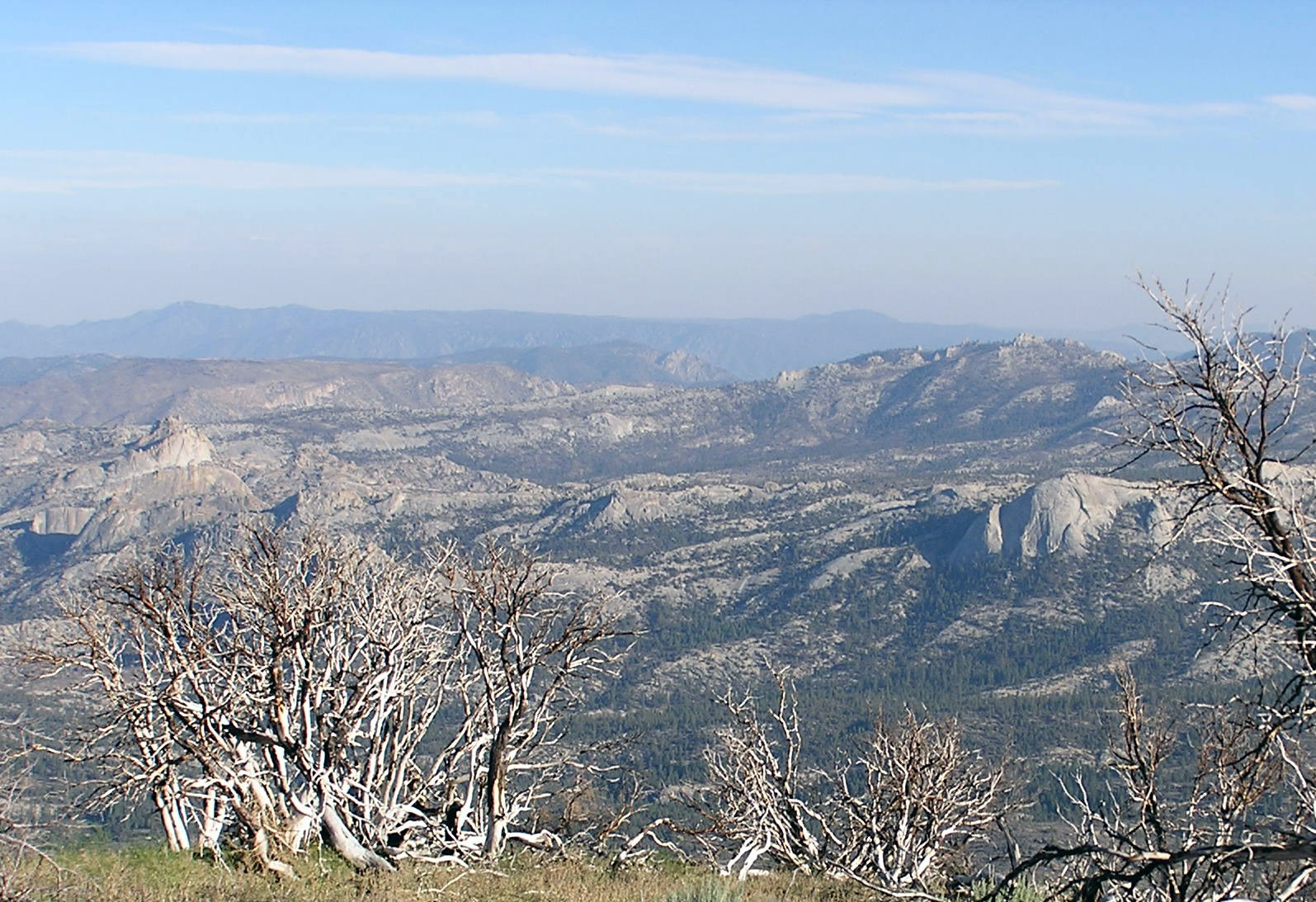
- Domeland Wilderness from Bald Mountain, summer 2007.

- Location within the United States
- Location: Tulare / Kern counties, California, USA
- Nearest city: Porterville, California/ Ridgecrest, California
- Coordinates: 35°53′00″N 118°12′33″W
- Area: 130,081 acres (526.42 km^{2})
- Established: 1964
- Governing body: U. S. Forest Service, Bureau of Land Management

The Domeland Wilderness is a federally designated wilderness area located 55 miles (89 km) northeast of Bakersfield, California USA. It encompasses 130,081 acres (526.42 km^{2}), is jointly managed by the U.S. Forest Service and Bureau of Land Management (BLM) and is mostly within the Sequoia National Forest.

== History ==
Domeland Wilderness was created by the federal Wilderness Act of 1964 and expanded by the California Desert Protection Act of 1994, adding 36,000 acres (150 km^{2}) of BLM land.

The wilderness area is prone to large wildfires with the Manter wildfire in July 2000 burning more than 74,000 acres (300 km^{2}) of the wilderness. The area also was burned by the Trout and Long Fires of 2024.

== Geography ==
Elevations range from 2,800 feet (850 m) up to 9,977 feet (3,041 m).

The wilderness protects the southern area of the Kern Plateau with the Wild and Scenic South Fork Kern River bisecting the wilderness down the middle from north to south. The highest area of the plateau is the middle of the wilderness with large expanses of bedrock with cliffs, domes and spires that give the wilderness its name. One of the most outstanding rock formations is Church Dome. Interspersed with these formations are mixed conifer forests ranging from white fir and Jeffrey pine to Limber Pine and foxtail pine at the highest elevations.

The western boundary is defined by a broken granite ridge with another ridge divide at the northern boundary. Large meadows occur in the wilderness and provide summer range for the Kern River deer herd and the Monarche herd as well. Other animals in the wilderness include the mountain lion, bobcat, and American black bear. A large population of rattlesnakes reside within the wilderness and visitors should use extra caution, especially in the area of the South Fork Kern River.

== Recreation ==
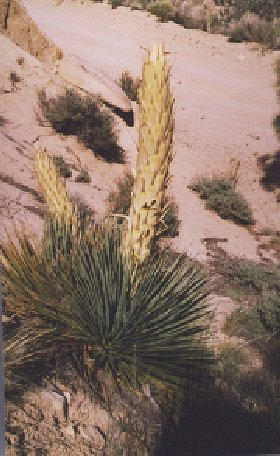
Parry's Beargrass

Extreme heat in the summer months as well as low water makes the Domeland lightly visited until autumn, winter or spring.

Activities in the wilderness are cross-country skiing and snowshoeing in the winter, as well as day-hiking, backpacking, fishing and rock climbing.

There are three campgrounds near the wilderness: Long Valley, Chimney Rock and Kennedy Meadows.

The Pacific Crest Trail runs through the wilderness for seven miles (11 km) next to the South Fork Kern River. The Rockhouse Trail follows the river for another four miles (6.4 km). A ford across the river is required to access higher elevations in the wilderness. The trails in the wilderness traverse the variety of topography and can be accessed via 10 trailheads. The Domeland Trail goes through the most rugged, rocky part of the wilderness.

Fishing for brown trout and rainbow trout is popular at this part of South Fork Kern River as well as other streams such as Fish Creek, Manter Creek, Taylor Creek and Trout Creek. The upper reaches of these creeks can contain golden trout.

Rock climbing in Domeland Wilderness is possible, with seldom climbed class 5+ routes.

The Forest Service encourages the practice of Leave No Trace principles of outdoor travel to minimize human impact on the environment.

== See also ==
- List of wilderness areas in California
