= Pedro Fire =

2024 wildfire in California, USA

- Part of the 2024 California wildfires
- Date: July 30, 2024 –; August 8, 2024 (9 days)
- Location: Mariposa and Tuolumne counties, California

Statistics
- Burned area: 3,815 acres (1,544 ha; 6 sq mi; 15 km^{2})

Impacts
- Deaths: 0
- Injuries: 0
- Evacuated: >4,000
- Structures lost: 2 destroyed, 3 damaged

Ignition
- Cause: Under investigation

The Pedro Fire was a wildfire that burned in Mariposa and Tuolumne counties in California. The fire began on July 30, 2024, and the cause is currently under investigation. The fire prompted evacuations in multiple areas. The fire was contained on August 8, over a week after the fire began. The fire destroyed two structures and damaged 3 others.

== Progression ==
The fire started near Highway 132 and Piney Creek Road at around 12:50 p.m. on July 30, located west of Coulterville near the Don Pedro Reservoir. It was reported at 100 acres (40 ha). The fire was described as having a "moderate to dangerous rate of spread." The fire burned in dry, grassy areas. Evacuations orders had been downgraded to warnings by July 31, allowing residents to return. There were 650 personnel working on the fire, now about 3,800 acres (1,500 ha) with 10% containment. On August 8, the fire reached 100 percent containment after burning a total of 3,815 acres.

== Effects ==
=== Evacuations and closures ===
The fire caused the evacuations of several areas in Mariposa and Tuolumne counties, including the Barrett Cove Marina and Recreation area, Piney Creek Road, Arbolada Road and the Hunters Valley Area. 788 personnel were dispatched to the fire, and air tankers were sent out to extinguish the fire, and on August 1 that number dropped to 664.

A portion of State Route 132 was closed because of the fire.

=== Damage ===
The fire burned across 3,815 acres of land as of August 8, and has been confirmed to have destroyed two buildings and damaged three others.

== Growth and containment table ==
Date	Area burned	Personnel	Containment
July 30, 2024 at 02:08 PM PDT	100 acres (0 km^{2})	0	
July 30, 2024 at 02:25 PM PDT	100 acres (0 km^{2})	0	
July 30, 2024 at 04:12 PM PDT	600 acres (2 km^{2})	0	
July 30, 2024 at 05:17 PM PDT	600 acres (2 km^{2})	300	
July 30, 2024 at 05:31 PM PDT	600 acres (2 km^{2})	300	
July 30, 2024 at 05:31 PM PDT	600 acres (2 km^{2})	300	
July 30, 2024 at 06:23 PM PDT	900 acres (4 km^{2})	300	
July 30, 2024 at 06:57 PM PDT	900 acres (4 km^{2})	300	
July 30, 2024 at 07:12 PM PDT	900 acres (4 km^{2})	300	
July 30, 2024 at 10:00 PM PDT	2,727 acres (11 km^{2})	300	
July 31, 2024 at 08:19 AM PDT	2,727 acres (11 km^{2})	300	
July 31, 2024 at 08:48 AM PDT	2,727 acres (11 km^{2})	255	
August 8, 2024 at 08:14 PM PDT	3,815 acres (15 km^{2})	195	

== See also ==
- 2024 California wildfires
- Park Fire
- List of California wildfires
