= Nixon Fire =

2024 wildfire in Southern California, USA

- Part of the 2024 California wildfires
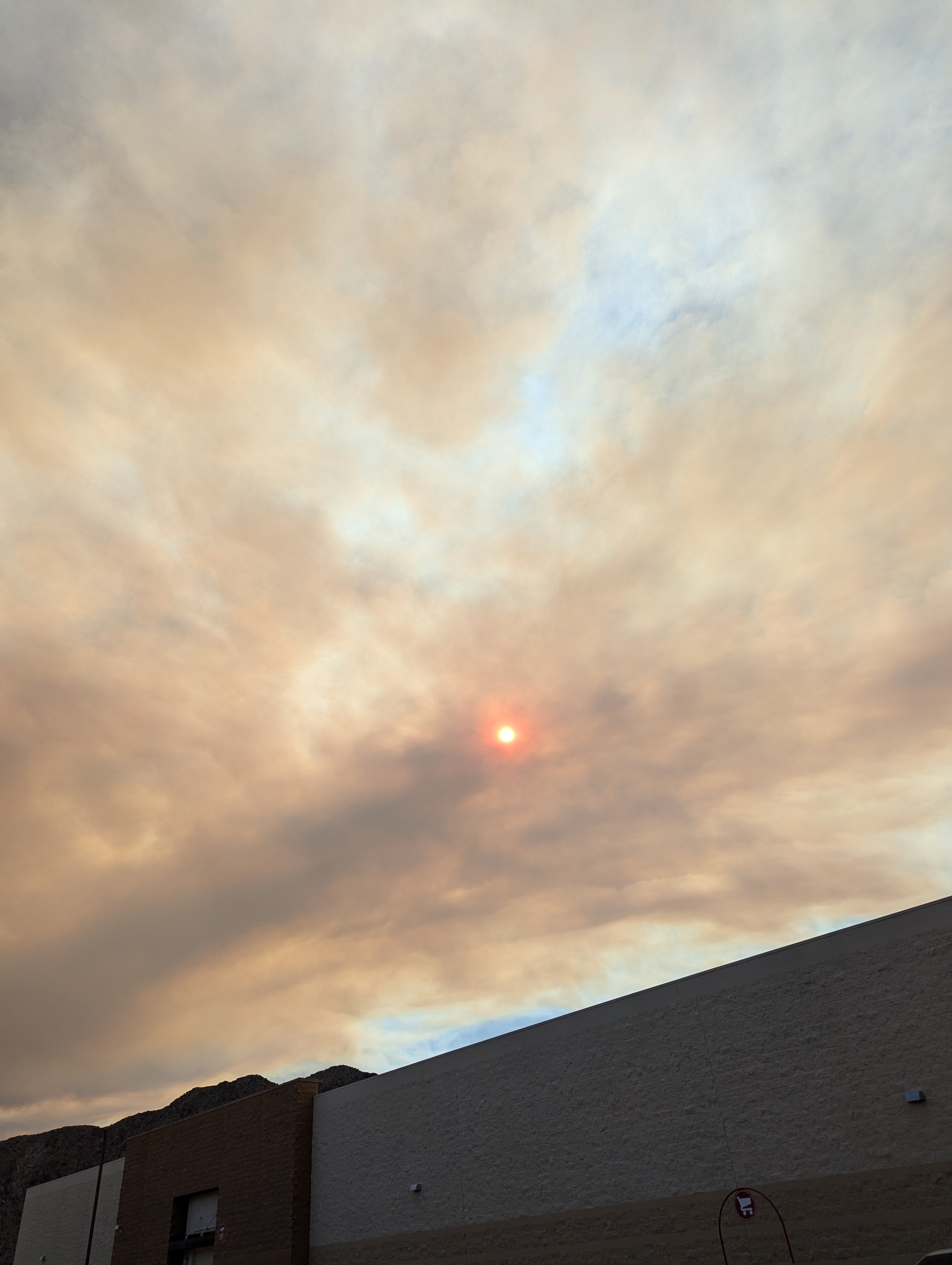
- Smoke clouds seen from La Quinta
- Date: July 29, 2024 –; August 7, 2024
- Location: Riverside county, California
- Coordinates: 33°26′34″N 116°51′54″W

Statistics
- Perimeter: 100 percent contained
- Burned area: 5,222 acres (2,113 ha; 8 sq mi; 21 km^{2})

Impacts
- Deaths: 0
- Injuries: 0
- Evacuated: 1,000
- Structures lost: 23

Ignition
- Cause: human-caused

Map
- The general location of the Nixon Fire in Southern California

The Nixon Fire was a sizable wildfire that burned in Riverside county in Southern California. It ignited on July 29, 2024, in the census-designated place of Aguanga in Riverside County. The fire burned 5,222 acres (2,113 hectares) and was 100 percent contained on August 7.

== Background ==
The fire burned 3,500 acres on day one in Chaparral with dry atmospheric conditions, a lack of recent burn history, warm temperatures, and strong winds helping the fire expand rapidly. On day two, the fire burned into the Beauty Mountain Wilderness area.

== Cause ==
The fire began in near Tule Valley Road and Richard Nixon Boulevard in Aguanga, California. It is located south of state highway California State Route 371. California Department of Forestry and Fire Protection (Cal Fire) determined the cause was a freestanding, privately owned electrical panel.

== Progression ==
The fire ignited just before 12:30 PM PDT (it was first reported at 12:28 PM) near Tule Valley Road and Richard Nixon Boulevard. By 03:04 PM, it burned 295 acres. The National Weather Service meteorologist Alex Tardy described the weather conditions "unfavorable" with low humidity and high temperatures. The fire was declared fully contained on August 7th.

== Effects ==
The fire prompted evacuation orders for around 2,000 buildings in Riverside County. San Diego county was under evacuation warning. The smoke could be seen from San Diego county. One residential structure was destroyed while four others were damaged. It moved into San Diego County. California Department of Forestry and Fire Protection and Riverside Fire Department set up an evacuation center in Temecula Valley High School in Temecula. It was closed as an evacuation center on Friday, August 2, 2024. A care and reception center was opened at Hamilton High School in Anza, California.

== Growth and containment table ==
Fire containment status Gray: contained; Red: active; %: percent contained;
Date	Area burned	Personnel	Containment
July 29, 2024	2,700 acres (11 km^{2})	0255	
July 30, 2024	4,941 acres (20 km^{2})	0741	
July 31, 2024	4,941 acres (20 km^{2})	0797	
August 01, 2024	5,222 acres (21 km^{2})	1047	
August 02, 2024	5,222 acres (21 km^{2})	1143	
August 03, 2024	5,222 acres (21 km^{2})	0990	
August 04, 2024	5,222 acres (21 km^{2})	0863	
August 05, 2024	5,222 acres (21 km^{2})	0409	
August 06, 2024	5,222 acres (21 km^{2})	0409	
August 07, 2024	5,222 acres (21 km^{2})	0000	

== See also ==
- 2024 California wildfires
- Park Fire
- List of California wildfires
