= Borel Fire =

2024 wildfire in Southern California, USA

- Part of the 2024 California wildfires
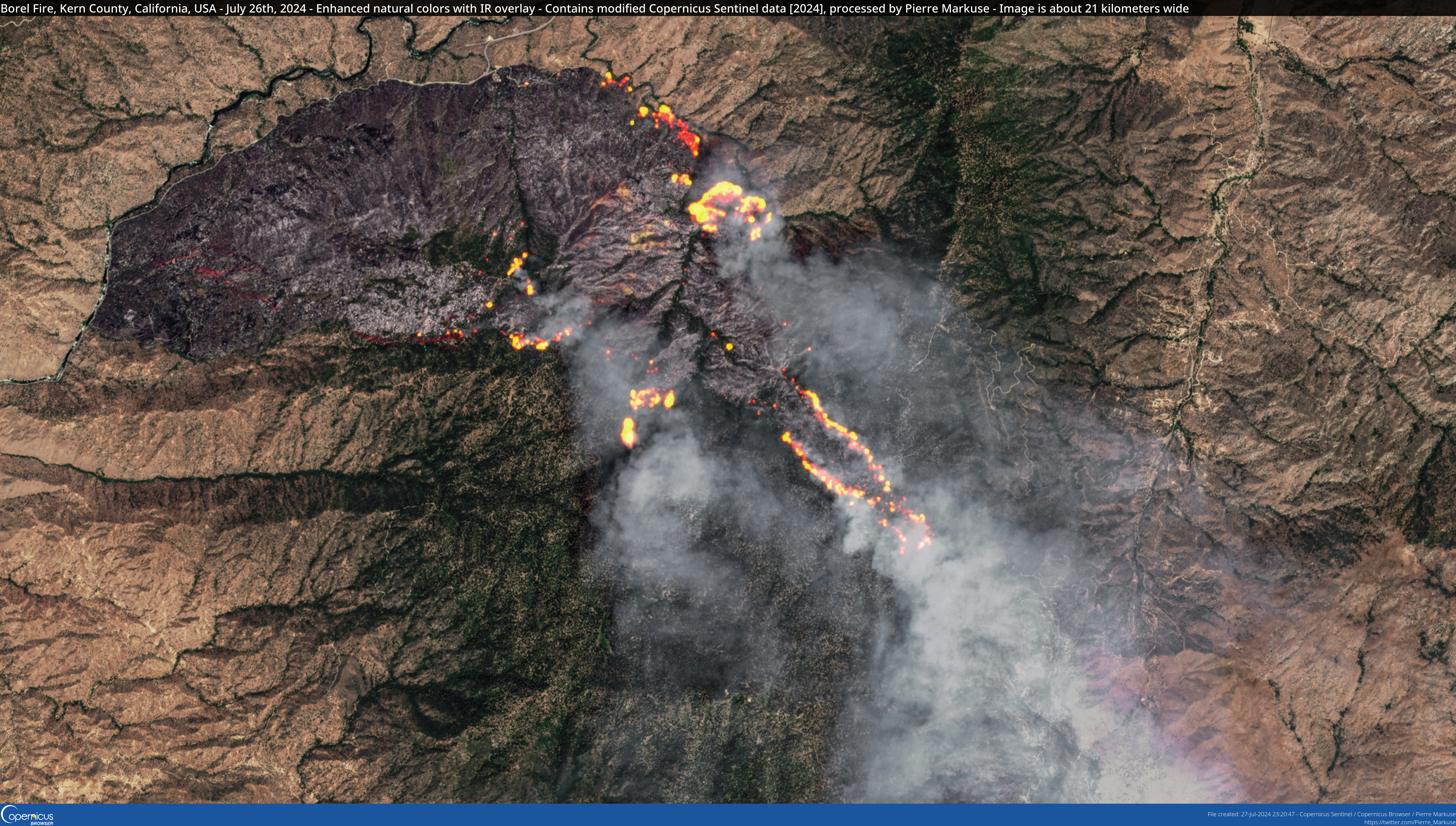
- Satellite image of the Borel Fire on July 26, 2024.
- Date: July 24, 2024 –; September 15, 2024; (53 days)
- Location: Kern County, California
- Coordinates: 35.5955°N 118.4816°W

Statistics
- Burned area: 59,288 acres (23,993 ha; 93 sq mi; 240 km^{2})

Impacts
- Deaths: 1 indirect (car crash ignition)
- Injuries: 2
- Evacuated: >4,000
- Structures lost: 223 (29 damaged)

Ignition
- Cause: Fatal car accident

Map
- Perimeter of the Borel Fire (map data)
- The general location of the Borel Fire in Southern California.

The Borel Fire was a large and destructive wildfire started on July 24, 2024 that burned south of Lake Isabella in Kern County, California. The fire burned a total of 59,288 acres (23,993 hectares) before being contained on September 15. The fire was caused by a fatal car crash which caught fire and spread to the surrounding hillside. Keith Mulkey was driving the vehicle that started the Borel Fire, he had six DUI convictions (three misdemeanor DUIs and three felony DUIs) and numerous alcohol related misdemeanor convictions.

The Borel Fire was the second largest wildfire in California's 2024 wildfire season, only behind the Park Fire in Northern California.

== Background ==
The Lake Isabella area has been known for its explosive and destructive wildfires in recent years and was most notably the location of the deadly 2016 Erskine Fire and 2021 French Fire. However, the area within the direct footprint of the Borel Fire has a very limited burn history aside from the 2010 Canyon Fire that burned 9,820 acres to the north.

== Progression ==
The Borel Fire ignited at 1 p.m. PDT on Wednesday, July 24, after a vehicle careened over the side of the canyon along Highway 178, killing the driver and spreading flames to the nearby vegetation in the Kern River Canyon. Due to the steep, rugged terrain of the area as well as the warm weather conditions, the fire was able to further establish itself up the canyon with a rapid rate of spread, east of Democrat Springs. Access to Highway 178 was subsequently closed to the public. By nightfall, the fire had expanded to 941 acres (381 ha) and had been placed under management of the SQF Lightning Incident that encompassed the nearby lightning-caused Trout and Long fires. Additionally, evacuation warnings were placed for local residents nearby the fireline.

The fire remained active into its second day of Thursday, July 25, as the fireline could be seen making its way across the ridgetops, escaping retardant lines established by air attack the previous day. By the afternoon, a large flare up on the southeast head of the fire sent it back into a rapid rate of spread. This prompted officials to upgrade the previous evacuation warnings for rural communities in the Kern Canyon to evacuation orders as the fire ballooned rapidly. An evacuation center for displaced residents was established in Tehachapi.

As the fire expanded so too did evacuations as a second evacuation center was established in Lake Isabella before being moved to Ridgecrest early Friday, July 26. Early that day, the fire had been pegged at 7,951 acres (3,218 ha). Throughout Friday, a Red Flag warning was put into effect as conditions deteriorated on the fireline.

The fire quickly continued its aggressive push to the east as high winds, low humidity and rugged terrain sent the fire explosively through the lower rural communities ahead of the fire. This included the historic mining town of Havilah which took a direct hit from the advancing flames, and by Friday evening had been almost entirely destroyed by the Borel Fire.

The fire raged further across the Breckenridge Mountain and crossed Caliente Bodfish Road where it advanced into the Tompson Preserve area by Friday night. By this time, the fire had exploded to 38,000 acres (15,378 ha) in size, was still zero percent contained and was described by officials as having grown at a pace similar to what would be expected from a Santa Ana wind driven fire.

As firefighters increased containment lines around the fire and weather conditions improved, growth of the fire slowed. Containment of the fire slowly grew during the month of August before finally being fully contained on September 15. By the time it was contained, the fire burned a total of 59,288 acres (23,993 ha; 92.638 sq mi).

== Growth and containment progress ==
The table shows the Borel Fire's growth and containment. Changes to the acreage number after August 1st are likely due to adjustments in the estimated area burned, rather than fire growth.

Fire containment status Gray: contained; Red: active; %: percent contained;
Date	Area burned	Containment
Jul 24	1,681 acres (7 km^{2})	
Jul 26	3,092 acres (13 km^{2})	
Jul 27	38,447 acres (156 km^{2})	
Jul 28	50,126 acres (203 km^{2})	
Jul 29	53,010 acres (215 km^{2})	
Jul 30	57,306 acres (232 km^{2})	
Aug 1	59,225 acres (240 km^{2})	
Aug 3	59,389 acres (240 km^{2})	
Aug 5	59,340 acres (240 km^{2})	
Aug 7	59,340 acres (240 km^{2})	
Aug 8	59,288 acres (240 km^{2})	
Aug 9	59,288 acres (240 km^{2})	
Aug 24	59,288 acres (240 km^{2})	
Aug 30	59,288 acres (240 km^{2})	
Sep 16	59,288 acres (240 km^{2})	

== See also ==
- Park Fire
- 2024 Kern County wildfires
- 2024 California wildfires
