= 2024 United States wildfires =

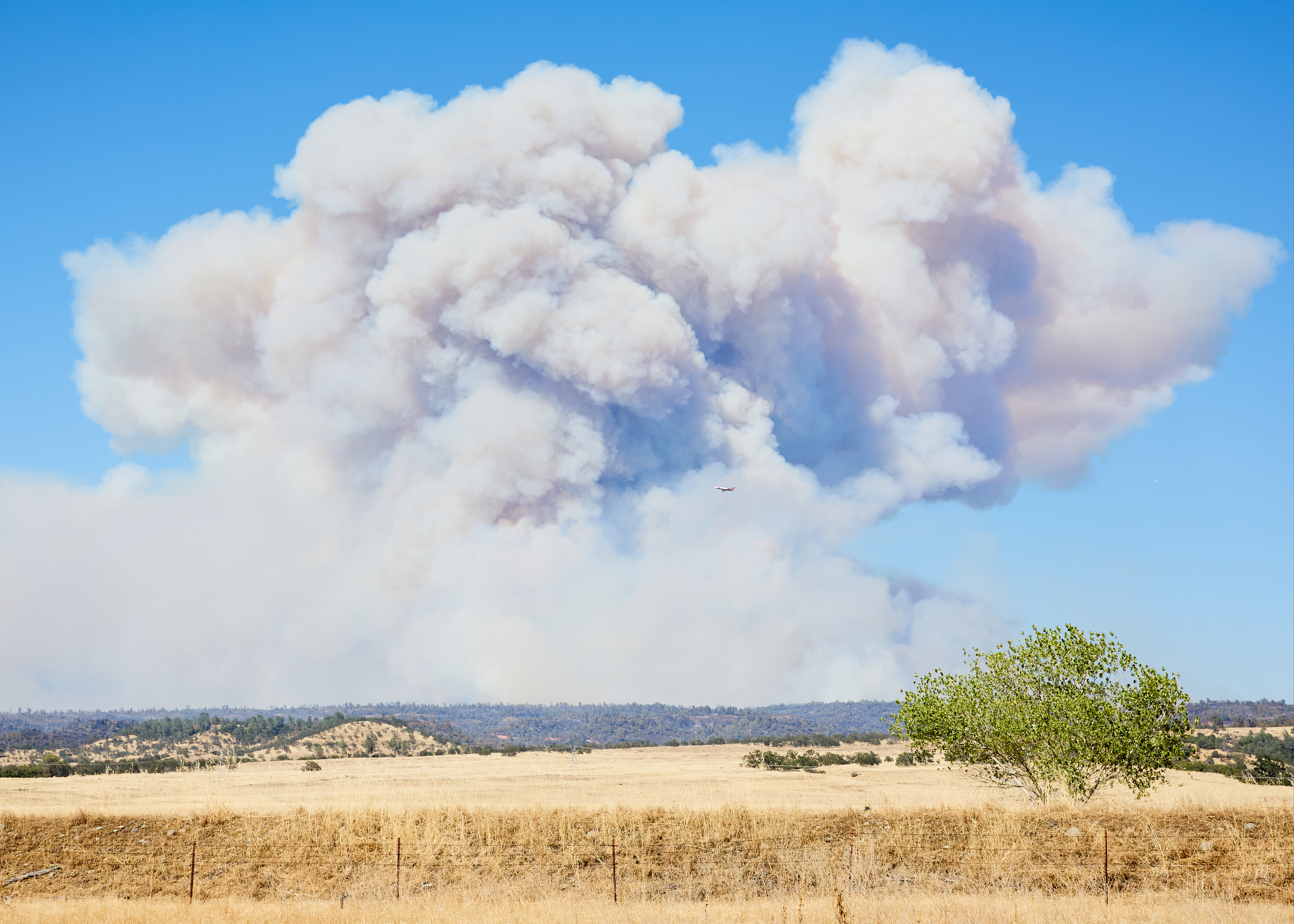
- Smoke Clouds from the Park Fire.
- Date: February 20, 2024 – February 4, 2025

Statistics
- Total fires: 64,897
- Total area: 8,924,884

Impacts
- Deaths: 11
- Structures destroyed: 4,552

This page documents wildfires across the United States during 2024, that have burned more than 1,000 acres (400 hectares), produced significant structural damage or casualties, or otherwise been notable. Acreage and containment figures may not be up to date.

== Background ==
=== Season background ===
While most wildfires in the United States occur from May to November—peaking in August—the length and severity of recent wildfire seasons have increased due to climate shifts. Warmer temperatures are causing snow to melt earlier in spring and delaying fall precipitation, drying out vegetation and soils. Drought and unseasonably hot weather are now more common. Pests such as bark beetles and invasive species like cheatgrass increase forest vulnerability. Dense vegetation and tree cover act as abundant fuel sources.

Climate projections indicate that wildfire seasons in regions like California and the Southwest will worsen as conditions grow warmer and drier over time.

=== Seasonal forecasts ===
In early 2024, seasonal outlooks by agencies such as the National Interagency Fire Center (NIFC) predicted a mixed risk profile across the U.S. A wet winter suggested a slower start to fire season, particularly in the Great Basin and Southwest. However, forecasts acknowledged potential early ignitions in mountainous regions if precipitation remained low in late spring.

=== Climatic conditions ===
A historically warm winter—among the hottest ever recorded—led to early snowmelt and low mountain moisture, particularly in the western U.S. By mid-2024, drought had spread, affecting 17% of the U.S. by late July. This dryness contributed to elevated fire risk in multiple regions.

By November 2024, drought conditions had worsened dramatically. A record 87% of the contiguous U.S. experienced some level of drought—an unprecedented level since the Drought Monitor’s inception—impacting areas from the Plains to the East Coast. Fuel conditions deteriorated steadily. In California, vegetation dried out as summer progressed under hot, dry conditions. Fire Danger Ratings frequently reached “High” to “Extreme” in several regions. The operational deployment of the GOES-T satellite bolstered fire detection and monitoring.

=== Firefighting response and mitigation ===
By mid-August 2024, approximately 5.3 million acres had burned in the western U.S., triggering fire advisories and large-scale resource deployment. While aerial and ground resources were heavily utilized, proactive mitigation through prescribed burns and fuel management was limited due to tight weather windows and widespread drought.

== Seasonal summary ==
The 2024 wildfire season developed gradually, with activity increasing through late spring and intensifying during the summer months. Several significant fire events occurred across the Western United States, particularly in Northern California, eastern Washington, and the central Rocky Mountains, where persistent drought and high temperatures created conducive conditions for rapid fire growth.

While overall fire activity in 2024 was lower than some recent peak years, firefighting agencies still faced considerable challenges. Smoke impacts were widespread during August and September, especially from large fires in Montana and Idaho. The use of aerial firefighting resources remained critical, though some operations were hindered by limited visibility and airspace conflicts. Fuel mitigation efforts, including thinning and prescribed fire, showed mixed effectiveness due to limited treatment coverage and complex terrain.

2024 United States wildfires by month
| | Jan | Feb | Mar | Apr | May | Jun | Jul | Aug | Sep | Oct | Nov | Dec | Total |
|---|---|---|---|---|---|---|---|---|---|---|---|---|---|
| Number of Fires | 994 | 3,809 | 457 | 7,433 | 5,046 | 3,472 | 6,943 | 5,477 | 5,042 | 8,111 | 4,974 | 9,927 | 61,685 |
| Acres Burned | 4,969 | 1,403,830 | 250,846 | 173,367 | 176,043 | 421,828 | 2,018,399 | 1,887,352 | 1,579,679 | 75,882 | 143,681 | 715,266 | 8,851,142 |

== List ==
| Name | State | County | Acres | Start date | Containment date (Note: Containment means that fire crews have established and secured control lines around the fire's perimeter. These lines are artificial barriers, like trenches or cleared vegetation, designed to stop the fire's spread, or natural barriers like rivers. Containment reflects progress in managing the fire but does not necessarily mean the fire is starved of fuel, under control, or put out.) | Notes | Ref. |
|---|---|---|---|---|---|---|---|
| RADAR | Florida | Polk | 1,300 | February 20 | March 1 | 2024 Florida wildfires – A human-caused wildfire. | |
| Jeff Davis Palestine Rd | Mississippi | Jefferson Davis | 1,409 | February 24 | February 28 | Caused $281,800 in damage. | |
| Leaf | Mississippi | Greene | 1,730 | February 24 | April 23 | | |
| North CIG | Texas | Moore | 4,012 | February 24 | February 25 | 2024 Texas wildfires – Reportedly human-caused. | |
| 353 I-80/Otto Road | Wyoming | Laramie | 2,193 | February 24 | March 25 | 2024 Wyoming wildfires | |
| Range 153 | Colorado | El Paso | 1,816 | February 25 | March 5 | 2024 Colorado wildfires – Reportedly human-caused. | |
| Highway 16 | Wyoming | Crook | 1,246 | February 26 | February 27 | 2024 Wyoming wildfires | |
| Walker | Oklahoma | LeFlore | 1,974 | February 25 | March 18 | 2024 Oklahoma wildfires | |
| Nature | Oklahoma | Cherokee | 3,542 | February 25 | unknown | 2024 Oklahoma wildfires - Reportedly human-caused. Caused an estimated $9,000 in damage. | |
| Wildcat Creek | Wyoming | Crook | 1,200 | February 25 | unknown | 2024 Wyoming wildfires – Estimated damage costs over $10,000. | |
| Betty's Way | Nebraska | Lincoln, Custer | 67,642 | February 26 | March 11 | Caused $602,498 in damage. | |
| Smokehouse Creek | Texas, Oklahoma | Hutchinson (TX), Carson (TX), Gray (TX), Roberts (TX), Wheeler (TX), Hemphill (TX), Lipscomb (TX), Ellis (OK), Roger Mills (OK) | 1,058,482 | February 26 | March 16 | 2024 Texas wildfires&2024 Oklahoma wildfires – Largest wildfire in Texas history. Reportedly human-caused. | |
| Windy Deuce | Texas | Potter, Moore, Hutchinson, Carson | 143,302 | February 26 | March 14 | 2024 Texas wildfires – Reportedly human-caused. Caused over $3,000,000 in damage. | |
| Grape Vine Creek | Texas | Gray | 34,883 | February 26 | March 10 | 2024 Texas wildfires – Reportedly human-caused. Caused $270,360 in damages. | |
| Sand Creek | Oklahoma | Harper | 2,645 | February 26 | February 29 | 2024 Oklahoma wildfires - Reportedly human-caused. Caused $120,913 in damage. | |
| Huliet Pass | Texas | Armstrong | 2,963 | February 26 | February 27 | 2024 Texas wildfires – Reportedly human-caused. | |
| Catesby | Oklahoma | Ellis | 89,688 | February 27 | March 17 | 2024 Oklahoma wildfires - Reportedly human-caused. Caused an estimated $1,300,000 in damage. | |
| Slapout | Oklahoma | Beaver | 26,020 | February 27 | March 8 | 2024 Oklahoma wildfires - Caused $322,936 in damage. | |
| Magenta | Texas | Oldham | 3,297 | February 27 | March 5 | 2024 Texas wildfires | |
| Range 135 | Colorado | El Paso | 7,744 | February 29 | March 5 | 2024 Colorado wildfires – Reportedly human-caused. Estimated damage costs of $100,000. | |
| Happy Jack | Wyoming | Laramie | 6,524 | March 1 | July 3 | 2024 Wyoming wildfires – Reportedly human-caused. Estimated damage costs of $120,000. | |
| Brushy Crossing | Florida | Liberty | 2,214 | March 2 | April 1 | 2024 Florida wildfires – This fire was reportedly human-caused. Caused at least $40,000 in damage. | |
| Boggsville | Colorado | Bent | 1,062 | March 2 | March 18 | 2024 Colorado wildfires – Reportedly human-caused. Estimated damage total of $178,000. | |
| 139 | Wyoming | Laramie | 2,017 | March 2 | March 26 | 2024 Wyoming wildfires – Reportedly human-caused. | |
| Snake Trail | Minnesota | Waseca | 1,604 | March 3 | March 29 | Estimated $20,000 in damages. | |
| Doran WMA | Minnesota | Otter Tail | 2,147 | March 3 | March 22 | Estimated $200,000 in damages. | |
| Roughneck | Texas | Hutchinson | 355 | March 3 | March 16 | The city of Sanford was evacuated due to the human-caused wildfire. | |
| Aubrey | Arizona | Coconino, Yavapai | 3,426 | March 5 | March 8 | 2024 Arizona wildfires | |
| Otter Road | Montana | Rosebud, Big Horn | 2,281 | March 10 | June 6 | | |
| Zink | Oklahoma | Osage | 8,410 | March 14 | April 10 | 2024 Oklahoma wildfires | |
| Flying G | Oklahoma | Tulsa | 1,110 | March 17 | April 1 | 2024 Oklahoma wildfires - Estimated damage totals over $100,000. | |
| Oak | Oklahoma | Osage | 1,033 | March 17 | April 1 | 2024 Oklahoma wildfires | |
| Capon | Virginia | Rockingham | 2,368 | March 20 | unknown | 2024 Virginia wildfires | |
| Rocky Branch | Virginia | Page, Rappahannock | 1,014 | March 20 | April 8 | 2024 Virginia wildfires – Estimated damage totals are $1,200,000. | |
| Waites Run | Virginia, West Virginia | Hardy (WV), Shenandoah (VA) | 6,223 | March 20 | April 29 | 2024 Virginia wildfires | |
| Waterfall Mountain | Virginia | Page, Shenandoah | 6,399 | March 20 | April 29 | 2024 Virginia wildfires | |
| Pear Tree | Oklahoma | Osage | 1,080 | March 28 | April 9 | 2024 Oklahoma wildfires | |
| Stabler | Oklahoma | Osage | 1,911 | April 5 | April 20 | 2024 Oklahoma wildfires | |
| Hinson | Florida | Lake | 2,352 | April 5 | August 12 | 2024 Florida wildfires – Reportedly human-caused. Damage totals are estimated to be $400,000. | |
| Twisted Arrow | North Dakota | Benson, Eddy | 1,365 | April 6 | unknown | Estimated $8,000 in damages. | |
| Rock | Arizona | Gila | 4,306 | April 11 | | | |
| Codell Rd | Kansas | Ellis | 1,568 | April 11 | April 22 | Reportedly human-caused. Estimated damage totals are over $160,000. | |
| Range 127 | Colorado | El Paso | 1,132 | April 15 | May 13 | 2024 Colorado wildfires – Reportedly human-caused. | |
| Parces Rd | Mississippi | Forrest | 1,730 | April 18 | June 24 | | |
| Mile Marker 32 | Texas | Kenedy | 1,424 | April 19 | April 24 | 2024 Texas wildfires | |
| Little Yamsay | Oregon | Klamath | 6,340 | April 20 | May 13 | Lightning-caused | |
| Wolf | Arizona | Coconino | 9,872 | April 29 | July 26 | 2024 Arizona wildfires | |
| School | California | Kern | 1,479 | May 2 | May 3 | | |
| Flying Bucket | Arizona | Maricopa | 2,795 | May 6 | unknown | 2024 Arizona wildfires | |
| Toyo | Arizona | Graham, Gila | 1,779 | May 10 | May 24 | 2024 Arizona wildfires – Reportedly human-caused. Estimated damage costs over $5,000,000. | |
| Laguna 24 | Texas | Kleberg | 12,385 | May 11 | May 28 | 2024 Texas wildfires | |
| Little Twist | Utah | Beaver | 5,367 | May 13 | August 22 | | |
| Hackberry Canyon | Texas | Potter | 1,088 | May 14 | May 25 | 2024 Texas wildfires – Caused an estimated $400,000 in damage. | |
| Spruce Creek | Colorado | Montezuma | 5,692 | May 14 | May 31 | 2024 Colorado wildfires – Estimated damage costs over $3,000,000. | |
| Blue 2 | New Mexico | Lincoln | 7,532 | May 16 | July 15 | 2024 New Mexico wildfires – Estimated damage costs over $25,000,000. | |
| Roberts | California | Monterey | 7,030 | May 17 | May 25 | Burned in Camp Roberts. | |
| Wildcat | Arizona | Maricopa | 14,402 | May 18 | July 29 | 2024 Arizona wildfires – Reportedly human caused. Estimated damage costs over $7,000,000. | |
| Spruce Creek | Colorado | Montezuma | 5,699 | May 14 | May 31 | | |
| Rabbit Valley | Colorado | Mesa | 1,505 | May 17 | June 20 | | |
| Indios | New Mexico | Rio Arriba | 11,477 | May 19 | August 2 | 2024 New Mexico wildfires – Estimated damage costs over $16,000,000. | |
| Rocky | Arizona | Graham | 1,598 | May 23 | May 29 | 2024 Arizona wildfires – Reportedly human-caused. Estimated damage costs over $1,500,000. | |
| Refuge | Arizona | Yuma, La Paz | 1,042 | May 25 | July 10 | 2024 Arizona wildfires | |
| Indian River Trail | Florida | Brevard | 2,006 | May 25 | June 16 | 2024 Florida wildfires | |
| Hill | California | Santa Barbara | 1,383 | May 28 | June 1 | | |
| Firebaugh | California | Madera | 1,300 | May 30 | May 30 | | |
| Corral | California | San Joaquin | 14,168 | June 1 | June 6 | Two firefighters were injured. Interstate 580 was closed in both directions. | |
| Spring | Arizona | Maricopa | 4,041 | June 1 | June 18 | 2024 Arizona wildfires | |
| West | California | Kern | 1,576 | June 2 | June 6 | | |
| Adams | Arizona | Maricopa | 5,029 | June 2 | July 13 | 2024 Arizona wildfires | |
| Road | California | Kern | 1,076 | June 4 | June 6 | | |
| Lost | California | Kern | 3,600 | June 6 | June 11 | 2024 California wildfires | |
| Bowden | Oregon | Malheur | 5,720 | June 6 | August 18 | | |
| Antone | New Mexico | Catron | 12,397 | June 7 | July 30 | 2024 New Mexico wildfires | |
| Pioneer | Washington | Chelan | 38,735 | June 8 | October 3 | Town of Stehekin ordered to evacuate (by boat) on the morning of July 28 | |
| McDonald | Alaska | Fairbanks North Star | 153,729 | June 8 | September 26 | | |
| Owl | Alaska | Yukon-Koyukuk | 15,963 | June 8 | September 26 | | |
| Top | Arizona | Gila | 3,292 | June 9 | June 18 | 2024 Arizona wildfires | |
| Creek | Wyoming | Cook | 1,471 | June 11 | June 28 | 2024 Wyoming wildfires | |
| OTR 31 | Idaho | Ada | 2,595 | June 11 | June 11 | Caused by human activity. | |
| Nisqually John | Washington | Whitman | 1,221 | June 14 | June | | |
| Foote | Arizona | Greenlee | 4,568 | June 14 | September 3 | 2024 Arizona wildfires – Estimated damage costs over $1,500,000. | |
| Bear | California | San Luis Obispo | 1,410 | June 12 | June 14 | | |
| OTR 47 | Idaho | Ada | 2,127 | June 15 | June 15 | Caused by human activity. | |
| Beam Road | Washington | Yakima | 8,542 | June 15 | June 18 | | |
| Neff Road | Washington | Walla Walla | 1,435 | June 15 | June | | |
| Junes | California | Butte | 1,056 | June 15 | June 18 | Destroyed one structure. | |
| Post | California | Los Angeles, Ventura | 15,563 | June 15 | June 26 | Began near Gorman, burning parallel to Interstate 5; caused the evacuation of ~1,200 people in nearby recreation areas. Damaged two structures. | |
| Encerrita | New Mexico | Cibola | 2,499 | June 15 | August 28 | 2024 New Mexico wildfires | |
| Hesperia | California | San Bernardino | 1,078 | June 15 | June 24 | | |
| Point | California | Sonoma | 1,207 | June 16 | June 24 | Prompted evacuations of some 400 residents northwest of Dry Creek Valley. Caused one injury and destroyed three structures. | |
| Sayer | Arizona | Coconino | 1,049 | June 16 | July 18 | 2024 Arizona wildfires – Estimated damage costs over $125,000. | |
| American Creek | Alaska | Lake and Peninsula | 4,934 | June 16 | July 26 | | |
| Muskeg Creek | Alaska | Bethel | 1,000 | June 17 | August 19 | | |
| Rabbit Valley | Colorado, Utah | Mesa (CO), Grand (UT) | 1,282 | June 17 | July 3 | 2024 Colorado wildfires – Reportedly human-caused. Estimated damage costs over $500,000. | |
| Aniak River | Alaska | Bethel | 2,361 | June 17 | August 16 | | |
| Owhat River | Alaska | Bethel | 1,390 | June 17 | August 16 | | |
| Sites | California | Colusa | 19,195 | June 17 | June 25 | | |
| Aero | California | Calaveras | 5,285 | June 17 | June 27 | Caused evacuations in both Calaveras and Tuolumne counties, damaged one structure and destroyed three. | |
| Salt | New Mexico | Otero, Lincoln | 7,939 | June 17 | unknown | 2024 New Mexico wildfires – Reportedly human-caused. Estimated damage costs over $10,000,000. | |
| Oskawalik River | Alaska | Bethel | 1,894 | June 17 | August 16 | | |
| South Fork | New Mexico | Otero, Lincoln | 17,569 | June 17 | unknown | 2024 New Mexico wildfires – Estimated damage costs over $70,000,000. | |
| Lower Meadow Creek | Alaska | Yukon-Koyukuk | 6,577 | June 17 | August 16 | | |
| Eightmile Creek | Alaska | Bethel | 4,379 | June 18 | August 16 | | |
| South Fork George River | Alaska | Bethel | 7,991 | June 18 | August 16 | | |
| Big Yetna River | Alaska | Yukon-Koyukuk | 4,273 | June 18 | August 16 | | |
| Van Hatten | Alaska | Yukon-Koyukuk | 22,944 | June 19 | October 2 | | |
| Midnight | Alaska | Yukon-Koyukuk | 50,550 | June 19 | September 26 | | |
| Naluk | Alaska | Northwest Arctic | 23,406 | June 20 | September 16 | | |
| Noodor | Alaska | Yokun-Koyukuk | 13,798 | June 20 | October 2 | | |
| Upper Applegate | Oregon | Jackson | 1,143 | June 20 | June 30 | Caused by human activity. | |
| Foraker | Alaska | Denali | 5,919 | June 21 | October 8 | | |
| Clear | Alaska | Fairbanks North Star | 23,410 | June 21 | September 26 | | |
| Long Bend | Oregon | Wasco | 1,024 | June 22 | July 26 | | |
| Von Frank | Alaska | Yukon-Koyukuk | 1,682 | June 22 | August 16 | | |
| Slide Ranch/Mission Road | Washington | Yakima | 3,106 | June 22 | July 9 | Began on Yakama Reservation, arson | |
| Oak Ridge | Colorado | Custer, Pueblo | 1,310 | June 22 | unknown | 2024 Colorado wildfires – Estimated damage costs over $18,000,000. | |
| Deep | Alaska | Yukon-Koyukuk | 24,882 | June 22 | October 8 | | |
| Main | Alaska | Yukon-Koyukuk | 28,147 | June 23 | September 16 | | |
| Pine Ridge | Wyoming | Goshen | 1,290 | June 24 | June 26 | 2024 Wyoming wildfires | |
| Iver | Alaska | Fairbanks North Star | 24,142 | June 24 | October 8 | | |
| Slate | Alaska | Fairbanks North Star | 26,492 | June 24 | October 8 | | |
| Fresno June Lightning Complex | California | Fresno | 10,616 | June 24 | July 6 | Consisted of the Flash, Bolt, Hog, and other fires. Ignited by lightning. Destroyed one structure. | |
| Globe | Alaska | Fairbanks North Star | 20,162 | June 25 | October 15 | | |
| Darlene 3 | Oregon | Deschutes | 3,903 | June 25 | July 1 | undetermined | |
| Grizzly | Alaska | Denali | 38,790 | June 25 | October 8 | | |
| Coonskin | Idaho | Twin Falls, Owyhee | 13,074 | June 26 | July 22 | Caused by lightning. | |
| Little Valley | Oregon | Malheur | 17,901 | June 26 | July 1 | undetermined | |
| Quinn Creek | Alaska | Bethel | 2,709 | June 26 | August 16 | | |
| Dry Lake | Oregon | Malheur | 2,670 | June 26 | October 9 | Lightning-caused. | |
| Soldier | Idaho | Owyhee | 5,313 | June 26 | June 30 | Lightning-caused. | |
| East Toklat | Alaska | Denali | 29,612 | June 26 | October 9 | | |
| Basin | California | Fresno | 14,023 | June 26 | July 20 | Prompted evacuations in the Kirch Flat Campground and Balch Camp area. | |
| Gold King Creek | Alaska | Denali | 6,538 | June 26 | October 9 | | |
| Pizona | Nevada | Mineral | 2,160 | June 26 | July 5 | Lighting-caused | |
| Yellow Peak | Nevada | Washoe | 1,262 | June 26 | July 2 | | |
| Sushana River | Alaska | Denali | 1,261 | June 27 | October 9 | | |
| SCD - Boulder View | Arizona | Maricopa | 3,711 | June 27 | July 16 | 2024 Arizona wildfires – Estimated damage costs over $4,000,000. | |
| Lockett | Arizona | Coconino | 2,782 | June 29 | August 22 | 2024 Arizona wildfires – Estimated damage costs over $200,000. | |
| Bluestem 24 | Texas | Brazoria | 2,420 | June 30 | July 7 | 2024 Texas wildfires | |
| National | Alaska | Yukon-Koyukuk | 15,381 | June 30 | October 3 | | |
| Mccain | California | San Diego | 1,595 | July 1 | July 10 | Prompted evacuations near Jacumba and caused one civilian injury. | |
| Fisher | New Mexico | Socorro | 8,044 | July 1 | July 21 | 2024 New Mexico wildfires – Estimated damage costs of $2,152,000. | |
| Weimer | Arizona | Coconino | 1,083 | July 2 | July 12 | 2024 Arizona wildfires – Estimated damage costs over $250,000. | |
| Ridge | New Mexico | Catron | 4,257 | July 2 | September 19 | 2024 New Mexico wildfires – Estimated damage costs over $5,000,000. | |
| Thompson | California | Butte | 3,789 | July 2 | July 8 | Caused evacuations in parts of Oroville and Kelly Ridge. Destroyed 26 structures, damaged eight. Two people were injured. Started by arson. | |
| Airline | California | San Benito | 1,295 | July 2 | July 5 | Caused one injury. | |
| Shelly | California | Siskiyou | 15,520 | July 3 | August 6 | Eight firefighters were injured. | |
| Joe Barker Road | Washington | Walla Walla | 1,436 | July 3 | August 14 | | |
| Billy Creek | Idaho | Nez Perce | 3,185 | July 3 | August 7 | Started along the Idaho/Washington state line. | |
| Olive | California | Kern | 1,357 | July 3 | July 5 | | |
| Road 11 | Washington | Ferry | 1,422 | July 4 | July | | |
| Thorp Road | Washington | McKenzie | 2,112 | July 4 | July 8 | | |
| Lake | California | Santa Barbara | 38,664 | July 5 | August 4 | Destroyed four structures, damaged one, and injured seven firefighters. | |
| Tea Time Hill | New Jersey | Burlington | 4,300 | July 5 | 2024 | | |
| Silver King | Utah | Piute | 18,222 | July 5 | August 1 | | |
| Walcott | Idaho | Cassia | 2,149 | July 6 | July 18 | | |
| Swany | Idaho | Ada | 1,154 | July 6 | July 9 | | |
| Deer Springs | Utah | Kane | 11,765.77 | July 7 | July 30 | | |
| North | California | Modoc | 4,685 | July 7 | July 14 | | |
| Boulter | Utah | Tooele | 2,243 | July 7 | August 30 | | |
| Salt Creek | Oregon | Jackson | 4,102 | July 7 | July 24 | Human-caused | |
| Vista | California | San Bernardino | 2,936 | July 7 | August 17 | Caused the evacuation of the Mt. Baldy ski resort | |
| Wilder | Nevada | Humboldt | 17,275 | July 7 | July 14 | | |
| North Creek | Nevada | White Pine | 1,100 | July 7 | July 14 | | |
| Pius | Arizona | Coconino | 1,999 | July 8 | August 25 | 2024 Arizona wildfires – Reportedly human-caused. Estimated damage costs over $10,000,000. | |
| Upper Pine | Oregon | Harney | 1,086 | July 8 | July 19 | undetermined | |
| MM97 I-84 | Idaho | Elmore | 6,336 | July 8 | July 12 | | |
| Horse Gulch | Montana | Lewis and Clark, Broadwater | 15,167 | July 9 | August 30 | Reportedly human-caused. Estimated damage costs over $25,000,000. | |
| Larch Creek | Oregon | Wasco | 18,286 | July 9 | July 26 | Human-caused | |
| Huntington Mutual Aid | Oregon | Baker | 4,511 | July 10 | July 16 | undetermined | |
| River | Oregon | Malheur | 2,799 | July 10 | July 13 | undetermined, near Owyhee Dam | |
| Buckhorn | Arizona | Graham, Apache | 1,006 | July 10 | August 10 | 2024 Arizona wildfires – Estimated damage costs over $3,000,000. | |
| Falls | Oregon | Harney | 151,680 | July 10 | August 22 | Human-caused, destroyed 23 buildings, pilot killed in tanker plane crash. | |
| Brown | Arizona | Pima | 1,423 | July 11 | August 20 | 2024 Arizona wildfires | |
| Cow Valley | Oregon | Malheur | 133,490 | July 11 | October 1 | Human-caused | |
| Bonita Road | Oregon | Malheur | 2,727 | July 11 | July 25 | Human-caused | |
| Bench Lake | Idaho | Custer | 2,595 | July 11 | August 22 | Caused by human activity. | |
| Black | Arizona | Maricopa, Gila | 11,153 | July 11 | September 4 | 2024 Arizona wildfires – Estimated damage costs over $7,500,000. | |
| Watch | Arizona | Graham, Gila | 2,162 | July 11 | August 24 | 2024 Arizona wildfires – Reportedly human-caused. Estimated damage costs over $5,000,000. | |
| Paramount | New Mexico | Sierra | 1,328 | July 11 | August 19 | 2024 New Mexico wildfires | |
| Freeman | Arizona | Pinal | 32,568 | July 11 | July 18 | | |
| Line Creek | Montana, Wyoming | Powder River (MT), Campbell (WY) | 2,496 | July 12 | August 14 | 2024 Wyoming wildfires – Estimated damage costs over $200,000. | |
| OTR 136 | Idaho | Ada | 1,106 | July 12 | July 12 | Caused by human activity. | |
| McGhee | Montana | Rosebud | 19,223 | July 12 | July 24 | | |
| Prairie | Montana | Rosebud | 6,540 | July 12 | July 23 | | |
| Deadman | Montana | Rosebud, Big Horn | 19,983 | July 12 | July 23 | Estimated damage costs over $10,000,000. | |
| Anderson | Montana | Big Horn | 2,783 | July 12 | September 4 | Estimated damage costs over $1,500,000. | |
| Quail Springs | Arizona | Mohave | 1,508 | July 13 | August 4 | 2024 Arizona wildfires – Estimated damage costs over $2,000,000. | |
| Lone Rock | Oregon | Gilliam, Morrow, Wheeler | 137,222 | July 13 | September 11 | undetermined | |
| Quail Hollow | Colorado | Arapahoe | 1,155 | July 13 | July 14 | 2024 Colorado wildfires – Reportedly human-caused. Estimated damage costs over $25,000. | |
| Mary | Idaho | Owyhee | 6,231 | July 13 | July 15 | Lightning-caused. | |
| Four Mile | Montana | Big Horn | 2,083 | July 13 | July 23 | | |
| Road 22 | Wyoming | Goshen | 5,577 | July 13 | July 14 | 2024 Wyoming wildfires | |
| Oregon Trail | Wyoming | Natrona | 1,540 | July 13 | July 22 | 2024 Wyoming wildfires | |
| Hurricane | California | San Luis Obispo, Kern | 12,703 | July 13 | July 17 | | |
| White | California | Kern | 5,562 | July 13 | July 26 | | |
| SQF Lightning Complex | California | Tulare | 33,026 | July 13 | September 17 | Contained the Trout and Long fires. The Trout and Long fires burned within the Domeland Wilderness. | |
| Rancho | California | Kern | 9,637 | July 13 | July 26 | | |
| Rim | California | Lassen | 1,025 | July 13 | July 23 | | |
| Apex | Arizona | Coconino | 2,989 | July 14 | August 5 | 2024 Arizona wildfires – Estimated damage costs over $200,000. | |
| Miller Peak | Montana | Missoula | 2,724 | July 14 | August 20 | Damage costs estimated to be over $25,000,000. | |
| Lost Hills | California | Kern | 4,032 | July 14 | July 15 | Crossed over and shut down a portion of Interstate 5 near Lost Hills. | |
| Hill | California | Humboldt | 7,224 | July 15 | August 14 | Caused 5 injuries | |
| Texas | Idaho | Latah | 1,565 | July 15 | August | Caused by human activity. | |
| Cougar Creek | Washington | Asotin, Garfield | 24,095 | July 15 | August 29 | | |
| Happy | California | Fresno | 12,543 | July 16 | November 15 | Burned in the Monarch Wilderness and Kings Canyon National Park. Started by lightning. | |
| Whip-poor-will | New Jersey | Burlington | 1,167 | July 16 | 2024 | | |
| Diamond Complex | Oregon | Douglas | 11,141 | July 16 | 2024 | 12 Lightning-caused fires. | |
| Ore | Oregon | Lane, Linn | 3,479 | July 16 | September 26 | Under Investigation. | |
| Swawilla | Washington | Ferry & Okanogan | 53,462 | July 17 | August 15 | Closed State Route 21 and Keller Ferry, evacuations of Keller and the Buffalo Lake area | |
| Easy | Washington | Okanogan | 2,130 | July 17 | October 1 | Closed North Cascades Highway (SR 20) | |
| Red | Oregon | Klamath | 3,060 | July 17 | November 12 | Lightning-caused fire. | |
| Battle Mountain Complex | Oregon | Umatilla, Grant, Morrow | 183,026 | July 17 | August 20 | Lightning-caused. Originally consisting of the North Fork Owens and Snake Fires, the Monkey Creek and Boneyard fires also merged into the complex. | |
| Chalk | Oregon | Lane | 5,991 | July 17 | September 14 | Part of the Oakridge Lightning Fires Complex. | |
| Coffeepot | Oregon | Lane | 6,176 | July 17 | August 23 | Part of the Oakridge Lightning Fires Complex. | |
| Coombes Canyon | Oregon | Umatilla | 3,224 | July 17 | July 22 | Lightning-caused. | |
| Durkee | Oregon | Baker | 268,492 | July 17 | August 7 | 2024 Oregon wildfires | |
| Rabbit | Arizona | Coconino | 3,016 | July 17 | July 26 | | |
| Lane 1 | Oregon | Douglas, Lane | 25,951 | July 17 | November 10 | | |
| Middle Fork | Oregon | Douglas, Klamath | 5,286 | July 17 | October 31 | Mostly located inside Crater Lake National Park, closing the north entrance. | |
| Pilot Rock | Oregon | Umatilla | 11,349 | July 17 | July 26 | Lightning-caused. | |
| Moss Mountain | Oregon | Lane | 2,849 | July 17 | October 25 | Lightning-caused. | |
| 208 | Oregon | Lane | 11,263 | July 17 | October 25 | Lightning-caused fire. | |
| Pyramid | Oregon | Linn | 1,312 | July 17 | September 24 | Lightning-caused fire. | |
| Twin Springs | Oregon | Malheur | 2,815 | July 17 | July 18 | | |
| Tanques | New Mexico | Rio Arriba | 6,500 | July 18 | August 21 | Caused by lightning. | |
| Horse Heaven Creek | Oregon | Lane | 3,198 | July 18 | November 6 | Part of Homestead Complex. | |
| No Man | Oregon | Lane | 2,148 | July 18 | November | Part of Homestead Complex. | |
| Clearwater | Wyoming | Park | 1,966 | July 19 | December | 2024 Wyoming wildfires – Damage costs estimated to be over $10,000,000. | |
| Miners Complex | Washington | Snohomish, Skagit | 1,098 | July 19 | October 31 | | |
| Bridge Creek | Washington | Ferry | 3,998 | July 19 | August 4 | | |
| Ridge | California | Lake, Colusa | 2,756 | July 20 | July 29 | | |
| Whisky Creek | Oregon | Hood River | 3,240 | July 20 | October 31 | | |
| Fuller Lake | Oregon | Douglas | 6,378 | July 20 | November 5 | Part of Homestead Complex. | |
| Allen Trap | Arizona | Gila | 1,649 | July 20 | August 24 | 2024 Arizona wildfires – Estimated damage costs over $20,000. | |
| Kekaha | Hawaii | Kauaʻi | 1,307 | July 20 | Unknown | | |
| Eagle | California | Riverside | 1,710 | July 21 | July 23 | | |
| Courtrock | Oregon | Grant | 20,019 | July 21 | August 17 | Lightning caused. | |
| Davin Road | Washington | Franklin | 1,948 | July 21 | July | | |
| Gold Complex | California | Plumas | 3,007 | July 22 | August 4 | Comprised the Smith and Mill fires. | |
| Black Canyon | Washington | Yakima | 9,211 | July 22 | August 1 | | |
| Badlands Complex | Oregon | Baker | 54,563 | July 22 | August 12 | Lightning-caused fires. Caused closures of Interstate 84 in eastern Oregon. Includes the Thompson and Coyote fires. | |
| Crazy Creek | Oregon | Crook, Wheeler | 86,968 | July 22 | September 25 | Lightning-caused | |
| Telephone | Oregon | Harney | 54,034 | July 22 | August 21 | Lightning-caused fires. | |
| Durgan | Oregon | Crook | 3,245 | July 22 | July 25 | | |
| Microwave Tower | Oregon | Hood River, Wasco | 1,312 | July 22 | August 12 | | |
| Bighorn | Washington | Klickitat | 51,569 | July 22 | July 30 | | |
| Whisky Canyon | Nevada | Lander | 1,246 | July 22 | July 25 | | |
| Metz | California | Monterey | 1,100 | July 23 | July 25 | | |
| Camp Creek | Oregon | Crook | 1,581 | July 23 | July | Lightning-caused. | |
| Apache | California | Ventura | 1,538 | July 23 | August 3 | | |
| Retreat | Washington | Yakima | 45,601 | July 23 | August 23 | Closed US-12, caused evacuations and county-wide declaration of emergency | |
| Gwen | Idaho | Latah | 28,820 | July 24 | August 8 | Caused by lightning. Firefighting efforts were complicated by dry, dead grass as fuel and steep slopes. 38 homes and 122 outbuildings were destroyed. | |
| Adessa | Arizona | Pinal | 1,424 | July 24 | August 11 | 2024 Arizona wildfires | |
| Stockade Canyon | Nevada | Washoe | 18,168 | July 24 | August 13 | | |
| Limepoint | Idaho | Adams & Latah | 33,084 | July 24 | September 22 | 8 miles north of Oxbow Dam. Merged with Oxbow Fire. | |
| Borel | California | Kern | 59,288 | July 24 | September 15 | Destroyed 223 structures and damaged 29. Prompted evacuations in Kern County and destroyed the historic community of Havilah. | |
| Hole In The Ground | Oregon | Malheur | 98,977 | July 24 | August 2 | | |
| Whiskey Mountain | Oregon | Harney | 4,357 | July 24 | August 8 | | |
| Cedar Creek | Oregon | Malheur | 1,546 | July 24 | July 30 | | |
| Grasshopper | Oregon | Malheur | 2,665 | July 24 | August 2 | | |
| Gilespie Spring | Oregon | Malheur | 2,556 | July 24 | July 25 | Lightning-caused. | |
| Park | California | Butte Tehama | 429,603 | July 24 | September 26 | 2024 California wildfires | |
| Thunder | Idaho | Lemhi | 2,474 | July 24 | August 8 | Lightning-caused. | |
| Badger | Montana, Wyoming | Big Horn (MT), Sheridan (WY) | 7,973 | July 24 | August 29 | 2024 Wyoming wildfires – Damage costs estimated to be over $1,000,000. | |
| Sugar | Idaho | Owyhee | 13,727 | July 24 | July 26 | Lightning-caused. | |
| Twentymile | Idaho | Elmore | 4,142 | July 24 | July 25 | Lightning-caused. | |
| Wapiti | Idaho | Boise & Custer | 129,063 | July 24 | October 31 | Caused by lightning. | |
| Dove | Idaho | Elmore, Owyhee | 3,260 | July 24 | July 28 | Lightning-caused. | |
| Wolf Creek | Idaho | Adams & Valley | 1,154 | July 24 | September 4 | | |
| San Clemente Island | California | Los Angeles | 13,000 | July 24 | July 30 | Burned more than one-third of San Clemente Island, damaging electrical infrastructure for the naval base there. | |
| Sand Stone | Arizona | Maricopa | 27,390 | July 25 | August 22 | 2024 Arizona wildfires | |
| Railroad | Montana | Ravalli | 1,583 | July 25 | November 6 | | |
| Wye | Idaho | Idaho | 13,137 | July 25 | November 4 | Caused by lightning. Was unstaffed due to higher priority fires. | |
| Poison Creek | Oregon | Grant | 1,060 | July 25 | August 7 | | |
| Sand | Oregon | Grant | 7,582 | July 25 | August 15 | Lightning-caused. | |
| Powerline Road | Oregon | Umatilla | 1,500 | July 25 | August 1 | Also referred to as the Walla Walla River Road Fire. | |
| Cliff Mountain | Idaho | Adams & Idaho | 1,108 | July 25 | August 20 | | |
| Ace Butte | Idaho | Idaho | 1,962 | July 25 | October 23 | Lightning-caused. | |
| Waterman | Arizona | Yavapai | 3,059 | July 25 | July 31 | | |
| Grouse | Montana | Beaverhead | 6,228 | July 25 | October 28 | Estimated damage costs over $12,000,000. | |
| Johnson | Montana | Ravalli | 8,438 | July 25 | November 5 | Estimated damage cost over $10,000,000. | |
| Summit | Arizona | Graham | 5,905 | July 26 | August 24 | 2024 Arizona wildfires – Estimated damage costs over $50,000. | |
| Brushy | Arizona | Graham | 8,284 | July 27 | August 24 | 2024 Arizona wildfires – Estimated damage costs over $60,000. | |
| 104 | Colorado | Weld | 1,782 | July 28 | July 31 | 2024 Colorado wildfires | |
| Anchor | Idaho | Idaho | 1,890 | July 28 | October 23 | Lightning-caused. | |
| Blizzard Heights | Wyoming | Converse | 1,957 | July 28 | July 29 | 2024 Wyoming wildfires | |
| Beaver Creek | Wyoming | Campbell | 1,081 | July 28 | August 31 | 2024 Wyoming wildfires | |
| Broom Canyon | Nevada | Nye, White Pine | 8,217 | July 29 | 2024 | Started by lightning. | |
| Lower Granite | Washington | Garfield | 14,482 | July 29 | August 2 | At least one structure destroyed. | |
| Alexander Mountain | Colorado | Larimer | 9,624 | July 29 | August 17 | 2024 Colorado wildfires – Estimated damage costs over $12,000,000. | |
| Nixon | California | Riverside, San Diego | 5,222 | July 29 | August 7 | Forced evacuations near Anza. Destroyed 23 structures and damaged three. Human caused. | |
| Pedro | California | Mariposa, Tuolumne | 3,815 | July 30 | August 8 | Destroyed two structures. | |
| Travin | South Dakota | Harding | 8,054 | July 29 | September 5 | | |
| Limpert 1 | South Dakota | Harding | 1,498 | July 29 | July 30 | | |
| Stone Canyon | Colorado | Boulder, Larimer | 157 | July 30 | August 8 | 2024 Colorado wildfires – Estimated damage costs over $6,000,000. | |
| Pleasant Valley | Wyoming | Platte, Goshen | 28,984 | July 30 | August 5 | 2024 Wyoming wildfires – Estimated damage costs over $5,000,000. | |
| Cold Springs | Wyoming | Converse | 1,846 | July 30 | September 24 | 2024 Wyoming wildfires | |
| West AER Motor | Texas | Cottle | 1,761 | July 31 | August 2 | 2024 Texas wildfires | |
| Hag | Utah | Box Elder | 3,610 | July 31 | August 1 | | |
| Bucktail | Colorado | Montrose | 7,192 | August 1 | August 21 | 2024 Colorado wildfires – Estimated damage costs over $10,000,000. | |
| Wildcat Creek | Wyoming | Campbell, Weston | 18,810 | August 2 | August 15 | 2024 Wyoming wildfires – Estimated damage costs over $2,000,000. | |
| Skeleton | Arizona | Yavapai | 24,034 | August 3 | August 24 | 2024 Arizona wildfires – Estimated damage costs over $4,000,000. | |
| Coffee Pot | California | Tulare | 14,104 | August 3 | December 16 | Burned in Sequoia National Park. Injured three firefighters. Started by lightning. | |
| Deer Creek | Wyoming | Sheridan, Campbell, Johnson | 6,700 | August 3 | August 25 | 2024 Wyoming wildfires – Estimated damage costs over $750,000. | |
| Gardner | Idaho | Blaine | 1,162 | August 3 | August 17 | | |
| Bartlett | Arizona | Maricopa | 6,161 | August 4 | August 29 | 2024 Arizona wildfires – Estimated damage costs over $1,500,000. | |
| Elk Lane | Oregon | Jefferson | 5,176 | August 4 | August 14 | Lightning-caused. | |
| Clair | Arizona | Maricopa | 2,170 | August 4 | August 29 | 2024 Arizona wildfires – Estimated damage costs over $1,500,000. | |
| Sheep | Arizona | Gila | 2,483 | August 4 | September 3 | 2024 Arizona wildfires – Estimated damage costs over $30,000. | |
| Central Canal North | Louisiana | Cameron | 2,834 | August 4 | August 7 | | |
| Hopkin | Montana | Carter | 1,130 | August 4 | August 5 | Damage costs estimated to be over $100,000. | |
| Jump | Idaho | Owyhee | 25,741 | August 5 | August 7 | Lightning-caused. | |
| Shirley | Montana | Powder River | 1,230 | August 5 | August 9 | | |
| Town Gulch | Oregon | Baker | 18,234 | August 5 | August 19 | | |
| Porcupine | Oregon | Harney | 6,495 | August 5 | August 19 | | |
| Soldier Creek | Oregon | Malheur | 11,061 | August 5 | August 14 | | |
| Warner Peak | Oregon | Lake | 65,866 | August 5 | August 24 | | |
| Stewart | Montana | Powder River | 1,150 | August 5 | August 7 | | |
| Williams Mine | Washington | Skamania County | 13,092 | August 5 | November 1 | People near Trout Lake evacuated; Mount Adams Wilderness and part of the Pacific Crest Trail closed | |
| Bulldog | Idaho | Boise & Valley | 11,423 | August 5 | October 28 | Lightning-caused. | |
| Dollar | Idaho | Valley | 4,360 | August 5 | October 17 | Lightning-caused. | |
| Flat | Idaho | Boise | 3,734 | August 5 | September 2 | Lightning-caused. | |
| Goat | Idaho | Valley | 36,718 | August 5 | October 28 | Lightning-caused. | |
| Calcite Creek | Washington | Okanogan | 4,500 | August 5 | August 25 | Pyrocumulus cloud generated a few miles away in Manning Provincial Park, Canada; NOAA potential fire alerts less than a mile from the border; Pasayten Wilderness trails closed beginning August 6. | |
| Nellie | Idaho | Boise & Valley | 50,073 | August 5 | October 28 | Lightning-caused. Merged with Anderson Fire on August 12. | |
| Paddock | Idaho | Gem, Payette, & Washington | 187,185 | August 5 | August 18 | Lightning-caused. | |
| Snag | Idaho | Valley | 33,437 | August 5 | October 28 | Lightning-caused. | |
| Farrow | Idaho | Idaho | 3,637 | August 5 | October 24 | Lightning-caused. | |
| Basin | Idaho | Elmore | 6,094 | August 5 | August 7 | Lightning-caused. | |
| Oreana | Idaho | Owyhee | 1,219 | August 6 | August 9 | | |
| Crozier | California | El Dorado | 1,938 | August 6 | August 20 | | |
| Dry Fork | Utah | Rich | 1,340 | August 6 | August 12 | | |
| Element | Arizona | Mohave | 5,364 | August 6 | August 19 | 2024 Arizona wildfires – Estimated damage costs over $3,000,000. | |
| Elkhorn Ridge | Idaho | Idaho | 3,140 | August 7 | October 31 | | |
| Big Gulch | Colorado | Moffat | 1,164 | August 7 | August 9 | 2024 Colorado wildfires – Estimated damage costs over $150,000. | |
| Paint Crossing | Texas | Throckmorton | 2,363 | August 7 | August 12 | 2024 Texas wildfires – Reportedly human-caused. | |
| Boise | California | Humboldt, Siskiyou | 12,967 | August 9 | September 20 | Burned in Six Rivers and Klamath National Forests. | |
| Ruby | Washington | Whatcom | 1,336 | August 9 | October 31 | | |
| Dixon | Oregon | Douglas | 1,965 | August 10 | August 21 | | |
| Parks | Idaho | Idaho | 5,997 | August 11 | October 31 | Lightning-caused. | |
| Robertson | Texas | Stephens | 1,610 | August 12 | August 14 | 2024 Texas wildfires – Reportedly human-caused. | |
| Prospect | Idaho | Idaho | 2,937 | August 12 | October 31 | | |
| Creek 232 | Texas | Throckmorton | 1,241 | August 13 | August 14 | 2024 Texas wildfires | |
| Midway Pasture | Texas | Wilbarger | 1,147 | August 15 | August 16 | 2024 Texas wildfires | |
| Red Creek | Texas | Haskell | 2,778 | August 16 | August 17 | 2024 Texas wildfires | |
| Dirt Road | Texas | Dickens, King | 1,524 | August 16 | August 20 | 2024 Texas wildfires | |
| Birch | Idaho | Valley | 23,094 | August 17 | October 29 | Lightning-caused. | |
| 0672 RV | Oregon | Gilliam | 5,490 | August 17 | August 21 | | |
| Magic Water | Idaho | Twin Falls | 2,368 | August 17 | August 18 | Caused by human activity. | |
| Square Lake | Idaho | Idaho | 5,240 | August 17 | October 24 | Lightning-caused. | |
| Ratio Mountain | Montana | Jefferson | 1,966 | August 18 | October 31 | Estimated damage cost over $1,750,000. | |
| Hobson | Nevada | White Pine | 1,080 | August 18 | August 23 | | |
| Daly | Montana | Ravalli, Granite | 11,386 | August 18 | November 6 | Estimated damage cost over $10,000,000. | |
| Peter Switch | Texas | Wichita | 1,658 | August 18 | August 19 | 2024 Texas wildfires | |
| Burnt Creek | Idaho | Valley | 2,665 | August 19 | October 11 | Lightning-caused. | |
| Raglan | Nevada | Humboldt | 1,787 | August 20 | September 2 | | |
| Stayman | Washington | Chelan | 3,118 | August 20 | August 24 | | |
| Barber Draw | Montana | Big Horn | 6,739 | August 21 | August 27 | Estimated damage costs over $5,000,000. | |
| Barber | Wyoming | Converse | 1,419 | August 21 | September 24 | 2024 Wyoming wildfires | |
| Flat Rock | Wyoming | Campbell | 52,421 | August 21 | September 25 | 2024 Wyoming wildfires – Estimated damage costs over $5,000,000. | |
| Constitution | Wyoming | Campbell | 24,630 | August 21 | September 14 | 2024 Wyoming wildfires – Estimated damage costs over $5,000,000. | |
| Geier | Wyoming | Weston | 1,474 | August 21 | September 24 | | |
| House Draw | Wyoming | Johnson | 174,547 | August 21 | September 17 | 2024 Wyoming wildfires – Estimated damage costs over $2,000,000. | |
| Sage Creek | South Dakota | Pennington | 1,959 | August 21 | September 13 | | |
| Range 77 | Nevada | Nye | 7,876 | August 22 | August 25 | | |
| Island Fire | New Mexico | Union | 1,600 | August 22 | August 28 | | |
| Reynolds | Idaho | Lemhi | 2,671 | August 22 | October 31 | Lightning-caused. | |
| Magruder Ridge | Idaho | Idaho | 3,778 | August 22 | October 31 | | |
| Remington | Montana, Wyoming | Rosebud (MT), Big Horn (MT), Sheridan (WY), Campbell (WY) | 196,368 | August 22 | September 21 | Damage costs estimated to be over $10,000,000. | |
| Chalky Point | Montana | Rosebud, Big Horn | 1,304 | August 22 | August 25 | | |
| North Art | Texas | Mason | 4,355 | August 22 | August 25 | 2024 Texas wildfires | |
| Big Hollow | Montana | Beaverhead | 3,435 | August 23 | September 5 | Estimated damage costs over $3,000,000. | |
| Sharrott Creek | Montana | Ravalli | 3,204 | August 23 | 2024 | Estimated damage cost over $30,000,000. | |
| Halfway | Idaho | Idaho | 1,502 | August 25 | {November 4 | Lightning-caused. | |
| Preacher | Arizona | Gila | 3,167 | August 29 | September 23 | 2024 Arizona wildfires – Estimated damage costs over $1,000,000. | |
| Black Mesa 2 | Arizona | Yavapai | 2,605 | August 31 | September 8 | | |
| Long Gulch | Arizona | Yavapai | 1,227 | August 31 | September 23 | 2024 Arizona wildfires – Estimated damage costs over $7,000. | |
| Wood | Arizona | Pinal | 7,211 | September 1 | September 13 | 2024 Arizona wildfires – Estimated damage cost over $350,000. | |
| Copperfield | Oregon | Klamath | 3,822 | September 1 | September 16 | | |
| Conroy Road | Oregon | Wasco | 1,500 | September 1 | September 2 | | |
| Silver Spoon | Wyoming | Campbell | 1,721 | September 1 | September 8 | 2024 Wyoming wildfires – Estimated damage costs over $3,000,000. | |
| West | Arizona | Gila | 15,074 | September 1 | unknown | | |
| Bear | California | Sierra | 3,323 | September 2 | September 19 | | |
| Lava | Idaho | Gem | 97,585 | September 2 | October 25 | Caused by lightning, merged with the Boulder Fire | |
| Syrup | Idaho | Elmore | 5,129 | September 2 | September 3 | Lightning-caused. | |
| Wiley Flat | Oregon | Crook | 30,185 | September 2 | October 11 | | |
| Mineral | Idaho | Washington | 15,392 | September 2 | September 8 | Lightning-caused. | |
| Chimney | Idaho | Elmore, Camas | 6,522 | September 2 | October 29 | Lightning-caused. | |
| Shoe Fly | Oregon | Wheeler | 26,817 | September 2 | September 15 | | |
| Oak Canyon | Oregon | Wasco, Sherman | 15,170 | September 2 | September 6 | | |
| Bigflat | Idaho | Washington | 3,662 | September 2 | September 4 | Lightning-caused. | |
| Glendale | Idaho | Blaine | 7,546 | September 2 | September 5 | Lightning-caused. | |
| Copper | Idaho | Valley | 2,129 | September 2 | October 24 | Lightning-caused. | |
| Red Rock | Idaho | Lemhi | 79,260 | September 2 | October 29 | Lightning-caused. Merged with the Black Eagle Fire on October 5. | |
| Berry | Idaho | Elmore, Gooding | 14,412 | September 2 | September 6 | Lightning-caused. | |
| Jones | Oregon | Malheur | 7,162 | September 2 | September 11 | | |
| Rail Ridge | Oregon | Crook, Grant | 176,661 | September 2 | November 1 | | |
| Solomon | Oregon | Harney | 2,600 | September 2 | September 8 | | |
| Sagehen | Oregon | Harney | 5,953 | September 2 | October | | |
| Boone | California | Fresno, Monterey | 17,600 | September 3 | September 13 | Prompted evacuations in Fresno and Monterey Counties. | |
| Chimineas | California | San Luis Obispo | 1,200 | September 4 | September 10 | | |
| Commissary | Idaho | Bonneville | 6,885 | September 4 | November 7 | Lightning-caused. | |
| Devils Knob | Oregon | Douglas | 4,149 | September 5 | October 17 | | |
| Line | California | San Bernardino | 43,978 | September 5 | December 23 | Prompted evacuation orders in parts of Highland and the entire community of Running Springs. Destroyed one structure and injured six firefighters. Started by arson. | |
| South Selway Complex | Idaho | Idaho | 1,928 | September 6 | October 24 | Lightning-caused. Consisted of the Lonesome, Goat Creek, Doe, and Twin Butte 2 fires. | |
| Bowman Well | Oregon | Lake | 2,853 | September 6 | October 14 | Lightning caused. | |
| Firestone | Oregon | Lake, Deschutes | 9,462 | September 6 | October 5 | Lightning caused. | |
| Service | Oregon | Wheeler | 23,890 | September 6 | September 25 | Part of Fossil Complex. | |
| Flat Top | Oregon | Lake | 36,362 | September 6 | October 5 | Likely lightning-caused. | |
| Young Grasshopper | Oregon | Lane | 5,313 | September 6 | November 9 | Likely lightning-caused. | |
| Davis | Nevada | Washoe | 5,824 | September 7 | September 25 | 14 structures impacted. Evacuations forced in New Washoe City and Southwest Reno. | |
| Buck Creek | Oregon | Lake | 5,758 | September 7 | October 8 | Likely lightning-caused. | |
| Linton Creek | Oregon | Lane | 1,310 | September 7 | November 3 | Likely lightning-caused. | |
| Frog | Idaho | Custer | 3,020 | September 7 | October 9 | Lightning-caused. | |
| Roblar | California | San Diego | 1,000 | September 7 | September 11 | Burned in Camp Pendleton. | |
| Table | Idaho | Owyhee | 17,497 | September 8 | September 10 | Lightning-caused. | |
| Little Lava | Oregon | Deschutes | 15,514 | September 8 | November 15 | Likely lightning-caused. | |
| Bridge | California | Los Angeles, San Bernardino | 56,030 | September 8 | November 26 | Burned in the Angeles National Forest. Prompted evacuation orders for Wrightwood and Mount Baldy Village. Destroyed 81 structures and injured eight firefighters. Cause under investigation. | |
| Logan | Idaho | Valley | 15,672 | September 9 | November 12 | | |
| Airport | California | Orange, Riverside | 23,526 | September 9 | October 5 | Began in Trabuco Canyon. Evacuations were along Ortega Highway and in surrounding areas. Destroyed 160 structures. Two civilians and 20 firefighters were injured. Started by equipment use. | |
| West Warm Springs | Wyoming | Hot Springs | 1,610 | September 9 | September 13 | | |
| Siphon | Arizona | Pinal | 15,527 | September 10 | September 27 | | |
| Point | Arizona | Maricopa | 5,154 | September 10 | September 29 | | |
| Short Draw | Wyoming | Campbell | 34,557 | September 11 | September 20 | | |
| Garden | Idaho | Lemhi | 13,036 | September 11 | October 26 | Lightning-caused. | |
| Salt Creek | Wyoming | Natrona | 1,520 | September 11 | September 11 | | |
| Power Dam Road | South Dakota | Mellette | 15,320 | September 12 | October 11 | | |
| Manderson | South Dakota | Oglala Lakota | 2,075 | September 12 | October 16 | | |
| Bear Creek | Wyoming | Albany | 1,444 | September 12 | September 20 | | |
| La Bonte | Wyoming | Converse | 3,506 | September 12 | September 25 | | |
| Nugget | Idaho | Idaho | 1,001 | September 13 | October 30 | Lightning-caused. | |
| Homestead | Montana | Sheridan | 1,000 | September 14 | September 25 | | |
| Prairie | Utah | Grand | 1,921 | September 16 | September 18 | | |
| Livingston Draw | Wyoming | Johnson | 1,400 | September 17 | September 23 | | |
| Bronco | Nebraska | Sioux | 1,069 | September 18 | November 12 | | |
| Brigade | Arizona | Coconino | 1,812 | September 21 | October 9 | | |
| Goosmus | Washington | Ferry | 1,738 | September 25 | October 4 | | |
| Long Hollow | Washington | Whitman | 4,000 | September 26 | September 27 | | |
| Elk | Wyoming | Sheridan | 98,352 | September 27 | November 14 | One firefighter injured. | |
| Pack Trail | Wyoming | Teton & Fremont | 89,930 | September 27 | November 7 | Merged with the Fish Creek Fire on October 5. | |
| Yellow Lake | Utah | Wasatch | 33,041 | September 28 | November 5 | | |
| Wildhorse 5 | Colorado | Weld | 1,204 | September 29 | October 2 | | |
| Rosie | Idaho | Owyhee | 5,628 | September 30 | October 17 | Caused by human activity. | |
| Jack Wells | Washington | Okanogan | 8,373 | October 1 | October 21 | | |
| Valley | Idaho | Ada | 9,904 | October 4 | October 23 | | |
| Martin | Idaho | Blaine | 1,100 | October 4 | October 5 | | |
| Elkhorn | North Dakota | McKenzie | 28,434 | October 5 | October 9 | | |
| Williams Co | North Dakota | Williams | 36,814 | October 5 | October 9 | | |
| Bear Den | North Dakota | McKenzie | 15,661 | October 5 | November 20 | | |
| Castle Ridge | Nevada | Elko | 25,885 | October 6 | October 19 | | |
| Pine | Oregon | Deschutes | 6,634 | October 7 | October 24 | | |
| Meridian | Montana | Madison | 3,900 | October 8 | 2024 | | |
| Flood | Arizona | Pinal | 4,400 | October 9 | October 16 | | |
| Shoe | California | Shasta | 5,124 | October 9 | November 8 | Burned in Shasta-Trinity National Forest. Injured one firefighter. Human-caused. | |
| Blue Star | Oklahoma | McIntosh | 1,318 | October 9 | October 12 | 2024 Oklahoma wildfires | |
| Vein | Arizona | Pima, Santa Cruz | 1,291 | October 12 | October 14 | | |
| Gabilan | California | Monterey | 1,200 | October 22 | October 23 | Burned in Fort Hunter Liggett. | |
| Diamond | Wyoming | Platte | 2,168 | October 22 | October 23 | | |
| Rush | Oklahoma | Comanche | 12,488 | October 24 | November 8 | | |
| Euchee Creek | Oklahoma | Payne | 1,279 | October 29 | November 4 | | |
| Cimarron Bend | Oklahoma | Logan | 2,112 | October 29 | November 1 | | |
| Unknown | Oklahoma | Lincoln | 1,130 | October 29 | October 30 | | |
| North Road | Oklahoma | Osage | 3,584 | October 29 | November 5 | | |
| Indian Creek | Oklahoma | Dewey | 1,575 | October 29 | November 1 | | |
| Horseshoe | California | Inyo | 4,537 | October 30 | December 12 | Began in Inyo National Forest. Was declared contained on November 14 before reigniting under strong winds late November 22. Destroyed two homes and six outbuildings. | |
| Mountain | California | Ventura | 19,904 | November 6 | November 27 | Destroyed 243 structures and damaged 127 near Camarillo. Injured five civilians and one firefighter. | |
| Jennings Creek | New York, New Jersey | Orange (NY), Passaic (NJ) | 5,304 | November 8 | November 22 | 2024 Northeastern United States wildfires – Over 1,300 firefighters were assigned. The fire closed Sterling Forest State Park. | |
| Butternut | Massachusetts | Berkshire | 1,676 | November 18 | December 2 | 2024 Northeastern United States wildfires | |
| Big Levels | Virginia | Augusta | 1,284 | December 2 | January 5, 2025 | | |
| Franklin | California | Los Angeles | 4,037 | December 9 | December 18 | Destroyed 20 structures and damaged 28 in Malibu. | |
| Horton | Arizona | Gila, Coconino | 8,346 | December 15 | February 4, 2025 | | |

Perimeters of wildfires in the United States during 2024 (>1000 acres) (map data)
