= Smokehouse Creek Fire =

2024 wildfire in Texas and Oklahoma, USA

- Part of the 2024 Texas wildfires and 2024 Oklahoma wildfires
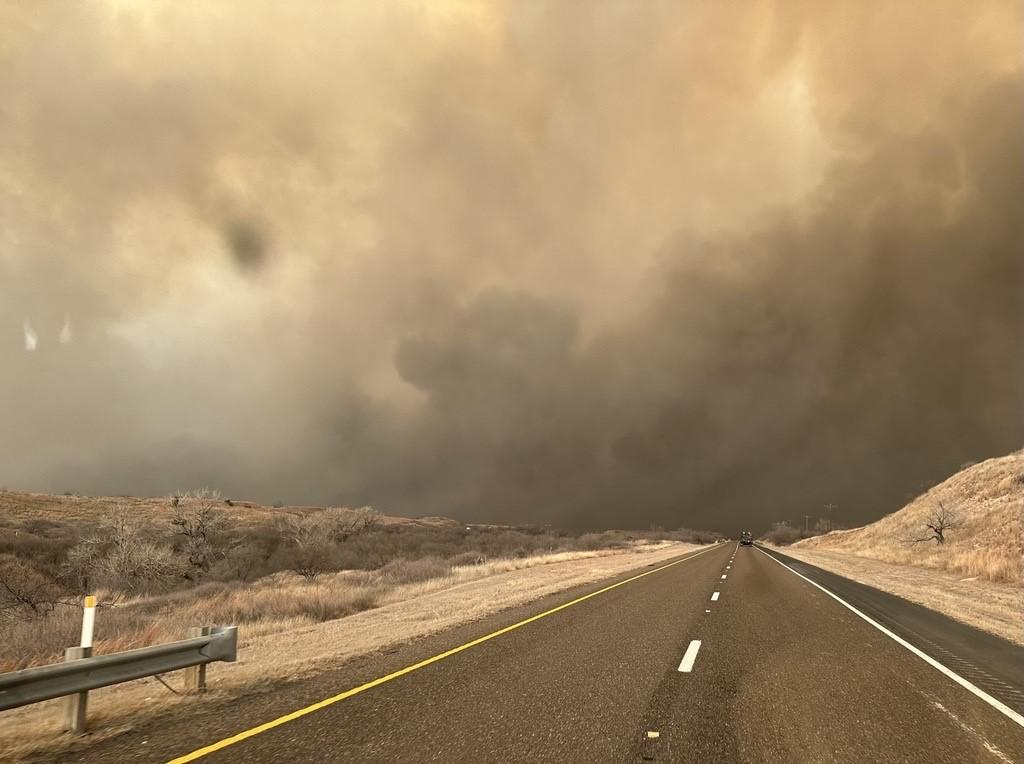
- Smoke from the Smokehouse Creek Fire streams across a road on February 27, 2024
- Date: February 26, 2024 – March 16, 2024
- Location: Texas Panhandle and extreme western Oklahoma, United States
- Coordinates: 35°50′52″N 101°25′57″W

Statistics
- Status: Extinguished
- Perimeter: 100% contained on March 16 , 2024
- Burned area: approx. 1,058,482 acres (1,654 mi^{2}; 428,352 ha)
- Land use: approx. 2.5% developed

Impacts
- Deaths: 2
- Cost: $1,000,000,000

Ignition
- Cause: Downed power lines due to broken utility pole

Map
- Perimeter of the Smokehouse Creek Fire (largest) with Windy Deuce Fire to the southwest and Grape Vine Creek Fire to the south (these were the second and third largest 2024 Texas wildfires). The Catesby Fire, the largest 2024 Oklahoma wildfire, is to the northeast. All of these started on either February 26 or the 27. (map data)

The Smokehouse Creek Fire was a record-breaking wildfire affecting the northeastern Texas panhandle and western Oklahoma that started on February 26, 2024. The fire affected numerous communities in Hemphill and Roberts counties, including the town of Canadian. As of March 16, 2024, the fire had burned approximately 1,058,482 acres (1,654 mi^{2}; 428,352 ha) before it was successfully contained, making it the largest wildfire on record in Texas's history (going back to 1988) as well as the largest wildfire in the United States during 2024. It was one of multiple fires during an outbreak of wind-driven wildfires in the Great Plains.

== Ignition ==
The Smokehouse Creek Fire began at approximately 2:20 p.m. CST on February 26, 2024, around one mile north of Stinnett, Texas by the intersection of County Road 11 and County Road O. The cause of the fire was downed power lines due to a broken utility pole. InciWeb records an ignition time of approximately 2:20 p.m. CST, but a heat signature was visible via the GOES-18 weather satellite as early as 12:56 p.m. As the fire spread to the east, it crossed and engulfed northern portions of a stream called Smokehouse Creek, becoming its namesake. The weather conditions over northern Texas at the time were highly conducive to the spread of fires, with unusually warm temperatures and gusty conditions prevailing over the region.

== Progression ==
Firefighters arrived on scene of the Smokehouse Creek Fire when it was already at least several thousand acres. The main strategy was protecting structures along Highway 136 and the firefighters succeeded, but once the fire was across the road, there was a vast fuel bed of dense, tinder-dry vegetation and grasses. This, combined with the critical fire weather conditions made the flames grow exponentially, reaching 500,000 acres (780 mi^{2}; 200,000 ha) within 12 hours of ignition, as the winds exceeded 60 mph and fanned the fire eastward at an extremely fast rate, reaching Roberts county by the end of the day and continuing to expand all night long, although fire behavior had moderated a bit.

On February 27, 2024, in the morning hours, the fire was still reported to be moving to the east, as it had "flared up again" according to crews on the front lines. At noon, the fire crossed into Hemphill county with mandatory evacuations in the communities of Canadian and Glazier. At the time, heavy equipment including bulldozers were used to push dirt over 1-60, in an attempt prevent the blaze from jumping the highway, but despite the efforts, the flames still leaped over the highway and dozens of houses in the town of Canadian were burned to the ground, although the city center survived. In fact, a video from crews showed the fire leaping across the highway in under 5 seconds due to the intense winds. Evacuations at the time then included Miami, Briscoe, Mobeetie, and Allison. Fire behavior was said to be extremely active in tall grasses and brush for the second consecutive day and by the late afternoon, the Smokehouse Creek Fire jumped the state line into Oklahoma prompting more evacuations on top of unrelated fires that sparked the same day.

Following another increase in low-level winds and better mapping, the fire was reported to be the second-largest Texas wildfire by the afternoon on the 28th, as smaller areas of the fire continued to expand to the north and south. Texas Governor Greg Abbott's disaster declaration stated that 60 counties were affected by fast moving wildfires including the Smokehouse Creek fire. An estimated eight hundred and fifty thousand acres were scorched. By 4:00 pm CST, this number went up even more due to better mapping and was now reported to have burned 1,074,047 acres (1,678 mi^{2}; 434,651 ha) with only 3% containment despite the continued heavy firefighting efforts. It had become the largest fire in Texas state history, overtaking the East Amarillo Fort Complex Fire in 2006, which burned 907,245 acres and caused 12 fatalities in various Texas Panhandle cities. Containment rose steadily on the Smokehouse Creek fire in the coming days as fire behavior remained inside of the fire's boundaries and no growth was reported afterwards.

== Effects ==
As of this final update in 2026 along with following inspections that were earlier delayed due to the conditions, after the fire was fully contained, the Smokehouse Creek fire destroyed at least 30 houses in the town of Canadian, Texas, over 100 houses in Hutchinson County, TexasAnd over 500 residential buildings and businesses in total. Another heavily impacted area was the city of Fritch by the windy Deuce fire, which reached over 130,000 acres and destroyed at least 100 structures just to the east of the smokehouse creek fire.

The smokehouse creek fire's burn scar stretched for nearly 100 miles from its origin point and was 25 to 35 Miles wide for much of the way, and at least 11,000 people were left without power following the destruction of power lines and miscellaneous infrastructure. Two fatalities, Joyce Blankenship from Stinnett, Texas, and Cindy Owens from Amarillo, Texas, have been confirmed along with 15,000 cattle killed. Animals were also reportedly saved from the flames

Growth and containment table
Date	Acres burned	Containment
February 27	500,000	0%
February 28	1,074,047	3%
February 29	1,058,482	-
March 1	1,075,547.98	15%
March 2	1,076,638	15%
March 3	1,076,638	15%
March 4	1,059,570	37%
March 5	1,059,570	37%
March 6	1,058,482	44%
March 7	1,058,482	74%
March 8–10	1,058,482	87%
March 11–15	1,058,482	89%
March 16	Final size: 1,058,482	100%

,*An estimated 31,000 acres in Oklahoma, 1,027,000 acres in Texas*

== Lawsuits ==
In December 2025, Texas Attorney General Ken Paxton sued Xcel Energy to recover over $1 billion in economic damages, including property damage and the lost value of wildlife, as well as civil penalties for violations of Texas law. Trial for the lawsuit is set to begin in April 2027. Ahead of the pending trial a judge issued a temporary injunction, ordering Xcel to replace damaged wooden electric distribution poles and inspect at least 35,000 poles per year.

== See also ==
- Wildfires in the United States
- 2024 United States wildfires
- 2024 Texas wildfires
- Utility-caused wildfires
- List of wildfires
- Wildfires in the United States during 2024
- 2024 Texas wildfires
- Bastrop County Complex Fire
- Utility-caused wildfires
