= Bucktail Fire =

2024 wildfire in Colorado, USA

- Part of the 2024 Colorado wildfires
- The smoke plume from the fire, as seen on the night of August 2
- Date: August 1, 2024 – Present
- Location: Montrose County, Colorado

Statistics
- Perimeter: 83% contained
- Burned area: 7,202 acres (2,915 ha; 11 sq mi; 29 km^{2})

Impacts
- Deaths: 0
- Injuries: 0

Ignition
- Cause: Accidental ignition

The Bucktail Fire was a wildfire in August 2024 that has burned through 7,202 acres (2,915 ha) of land in Montrose County in the U.S. state of Colorado. It began on August 1. It is currently the second-largest wildfire to ignite during the 2024 Colorado wildfire season. Local law enforcement criminally charged a man with accidentally starting the fire during an attempt to cremate his dog.

== Progression ==
The fire started at 11:30 AM on August 1 approximately six miles north of Nucla, and by August 2 the fire had reached 1,760 acres (710 ha). It was observed burning into pine groves and other forested areas that were unpopulated. Later on August 2, the fire had again grown to 2,046 acres (828 ha), and a helitack was assigned to extinguish the fire. By the evening of August 3, the fire had reached 5% containment while a total of 144 personnel worked to contain the fire. The Colorado Department of Public Health and Environment issued an Air Quality Health Advisory for Montrose County on the same day, as a result of smoke from the fire.

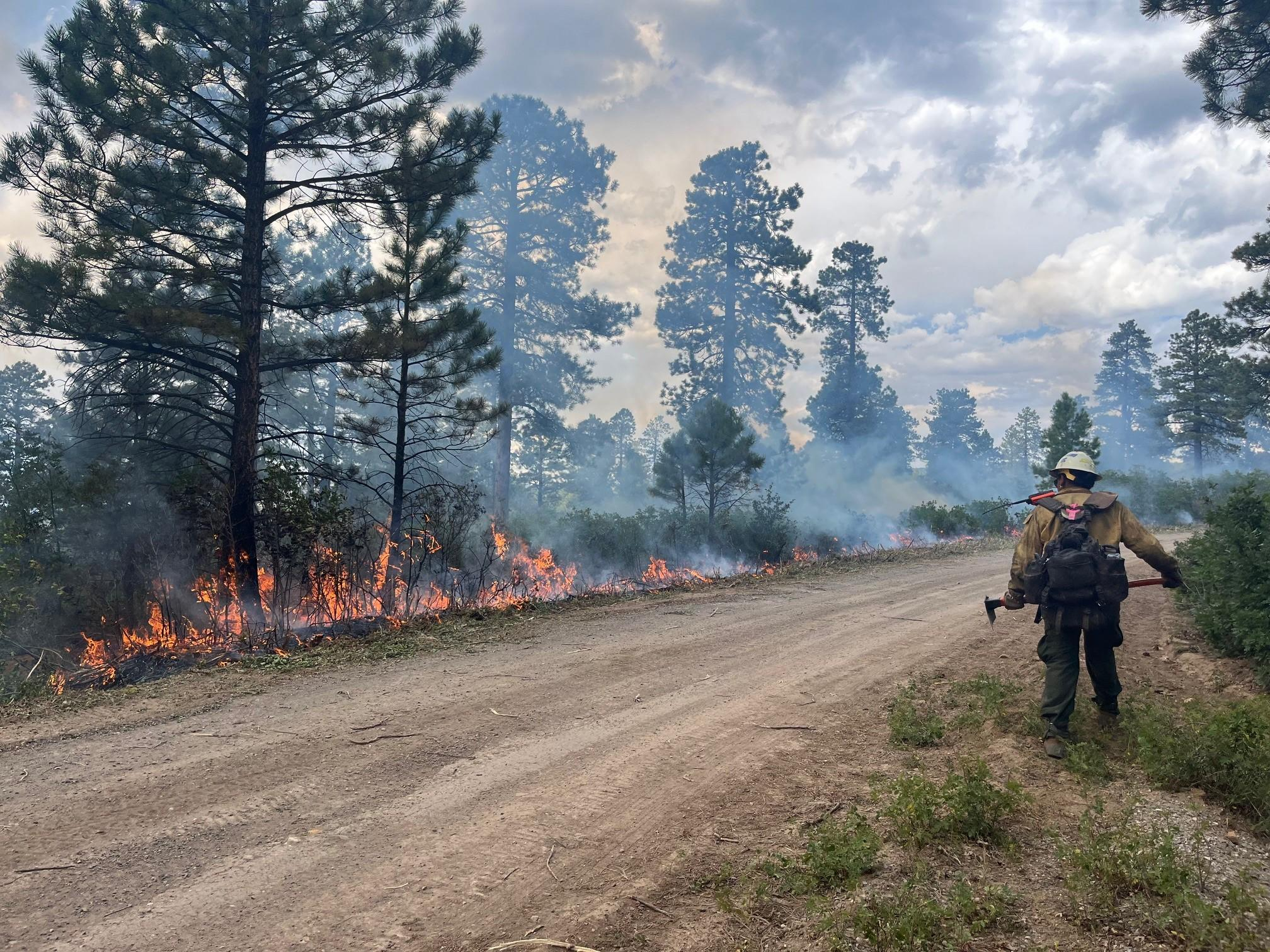
Crews working the fire on August 10

The fire gained 200 acres in coverage throughout August 4, and containment was kept at 5% while 154 personnel worked on the fire. County Road 25 Mesa and Houser Cow Camp Road were closed due to the fire. On August 5, containment on the fire reached 7% as crews continued construction on fire lines bordering the northwest side of the fire. The fire had reached 3,788 acres (1,533 ha) in coverage on August 6, while fire lines were retained around the fire. Containment had reached 10% on the same day, while the number of crews assigned to the fire decreased to 134.

On August 7, the fire grew to 4,155 acres (1,681 ha), and the number of personnel assigned to the fire jumped to 193. By August 8, crews had finished the fire lines on the northwestern side of the fire, and on August 9 the fire reached 7,177 acres (2,904 ha), and on August 10 it had reached 7,202 acres (2,915 ha), its maximum size. Large advancements were made on the fire from August 10 to August 11, and by the following day containment had reached 60%, aided by 121 personnel. By August 12, containment reached 67%, and the fire is estimated to be fully contained by September 30.

== See also ==
- Spruce Creek Fire
- 2024 Arizona wildfires
