= Utility-caused wildfires =

Subset of human-caused wildfires

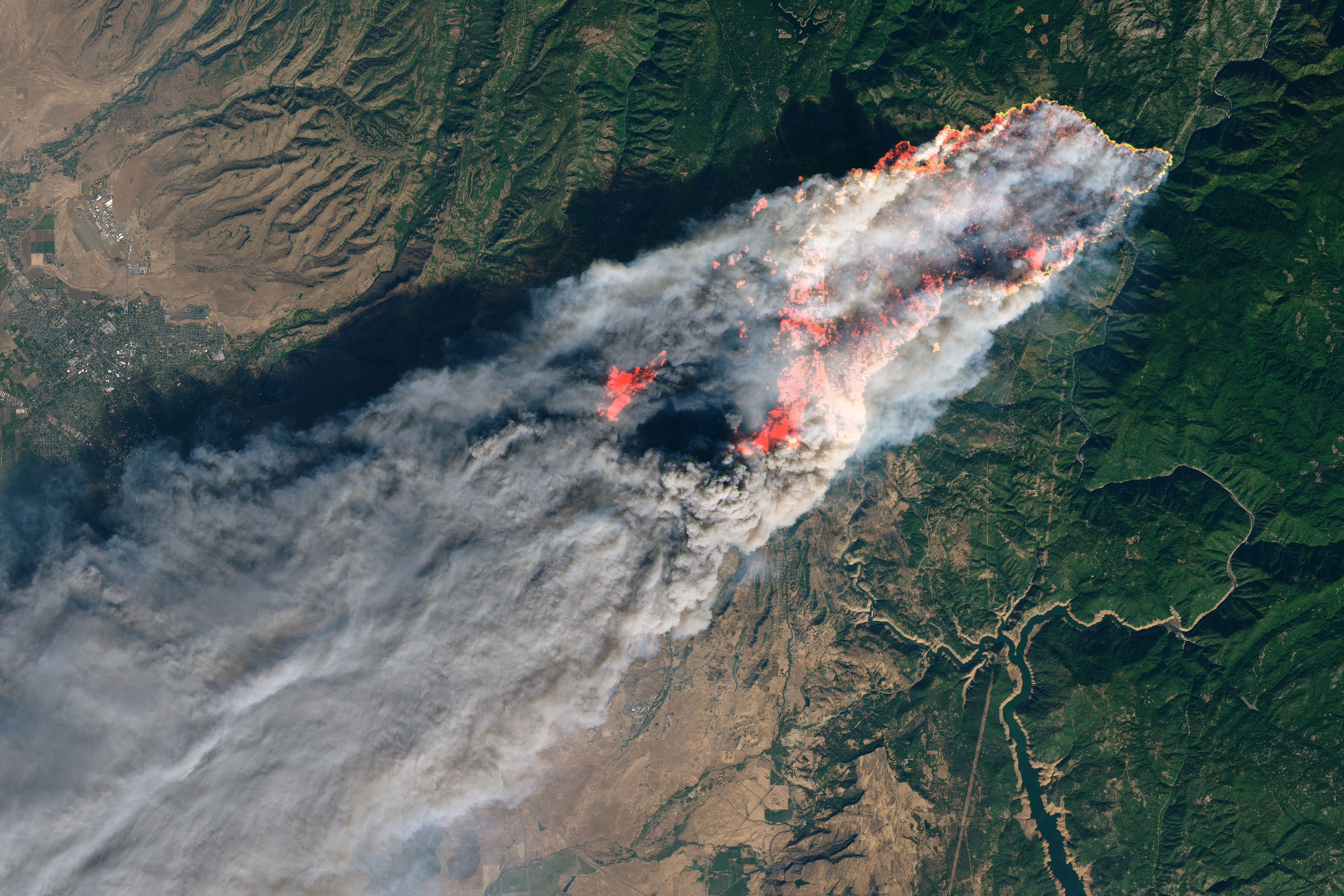
Camp Fire, as seen by the Landsat 8 satellite on November 8, 2018. Red highlights active fire seen in infrared.

Utility-caused wildfires are a subset of human-caused wildfires that are directly ignited by utility companies' infrastructure, such as power lines. Ignition often occurs when power lines come in contact with vegetation or other components of the electrical transmission and distribution infrastructure. Industry critics claim that the industry is not doing enough to mitigate these disasters. Utility-caused wildfires also threaten the utilities themselves, which can be found responsible for casualties and damage resulting from the fires.

== Notable examples ==
Throughout the world, utilities, especially overhead power lines, have caused many wildfires.

Name	Date/Year	Location	Causes	Impact
Black Saturday Fires	February 7, 2009	Victoria, Australia	High winds damaged power lines, causing electrical arcing that ignited dry vegetation.	173 fatalities, more than 450,000 hectares (1.1 million acres) burned, 3,500 buildings destroyed.
Thomas Fire	December 4, 2017	Ventura & Santa Barbara Counties, California, United States	High winds caused power lines to come in contact, producing sparks that ignited fuel below.	1 civilian fatality, 1 firefighter fatality, 281,000 acres burned, 1,063 buildings destroyed.
Camp Fire	November 8, 2018	Butte County, California, United States	A failed PG&E transmission tower C-hook broke causing a power line to fall and ignite dry brush.	85 fatalities, 153,000 acres burned, 18,800 buildings destroyed.
Kincade Fire	October 23, 2019	Sonoma County, California, United States	A broker jumper cable on a PG&E transmission tower broke, producing sparks, igniting dry vegetation.	77,700 acres burned, 374 buildings destroyed.
Zogg Fire	September 27, 2020	Shasta & Tehama Counties, California, United States	A dead Gray Pine fell onto PG&E transmission lines, igniting dry vegetation below.	4 fatalities, 56,300 acres burned, 204 buildings destroyed.
Dixie Fire	July 13, 2021	Northern California, United States	A Douglas fir fell onto PG&E distribution power line, igniting dry vegetation.	1 firefighter fatality, 963,300 acres, 1,329 buildings destroyed.
Lahaina Fire	August 8, 2023	Maui, Hawaii, United States	Broken powerlines created sparks ignited unmaintained vegetation due.	102 fatalities, 2,170 acres burned, 2,170 buildings destroyed.
Smokehouse Creek Fire	February 26, 2024	Texas Panhandle & Oklahoma, United States	A decayed utility pole fell on dry grass and ignited the grass.	2 fatalities, 428,300 hectares (1 million acres) burned, over 500 buildings destroyed.
Attica Wildfires	August 11, 2024	Attica, Greece	A loose electrical cable on a damaged wooden utility pole failed and sparked a fire beneath the line.	1 fatality, 10,000 hectares (24,700 acres) burned.
Highway 82 Fire	April 20, 2026	Brantley, Wayne, & Glynn counties, Georgia, United States	A Mylar balloon contacted a power line, causing electrical arcing that ignited vegetation below.	Over 22,000 acres burned, over 100 buildings destroyed.

== Causes ==
Utility-cased wildfires can be started by a variety of factors.

=== Downed lines ===
The vast majority of transmission lines, over 70%, in the United States are outdated, and are near 25 years old. The average age for power transformers that power over 90% of the country is 40 years old. Power lines, whether old or new, are susceptible to storm damage, and, in 30% of cases, the power line does not automatically shut off. This can happen when the fallen line draws too little electric current to activate a fuse or circuit breaker. These high-impedance faults (HiZ) can cause high-energy, high-temperature arcing that can cause ignition.

=== Contact with vegetation and foreign objects ===
Vegetation contact, and contact with foreign objects, such as trees, are leading causes of wildfires. In California, these factors were responsible for 35%, and 18%, respectively, of utility-related fires larger than 10 acres. Strong winds have been known to exacerbate these problems. Live wires can ignite dry vegetation and fuels, and fallen trees can result in downed lines.

=== Conductor slap ===
Power lines are traditionally designed with significant clearance between conductors, this prevents them from contacting under normal operating conditions. Under poor conditions, line conductors can slap against one another; this causes high energy arcing, and, occasionally, small bits of molten metal (generally aluminum) are ejected. These ejected pieces of molten aluminum can ignite wildfires.

=== Component failure ===
Many components, such as switches, transformers and insulators, contain thousands of complex circuits and parts. While often able to effectively provide service for decades, they do eventually fail. Occasionally, before complete failures, there is electric arcing and sparks that are too small to be detected by fail-safe sensors. These sparks and electric arcs can result in the ignition of vegetation or foreign objects.

== Solutions ==
Electric companies are investigating solutions such as burying power lines, installing sensors, and using software to monitor cables and automatically shut them off. In 2023 wildfire mitigation plans, Californian utility companies proposed over $9 billion to mitigate factors that cause wildfires.
