= 2024 Texas wildfires =

Natural disasters in the USA

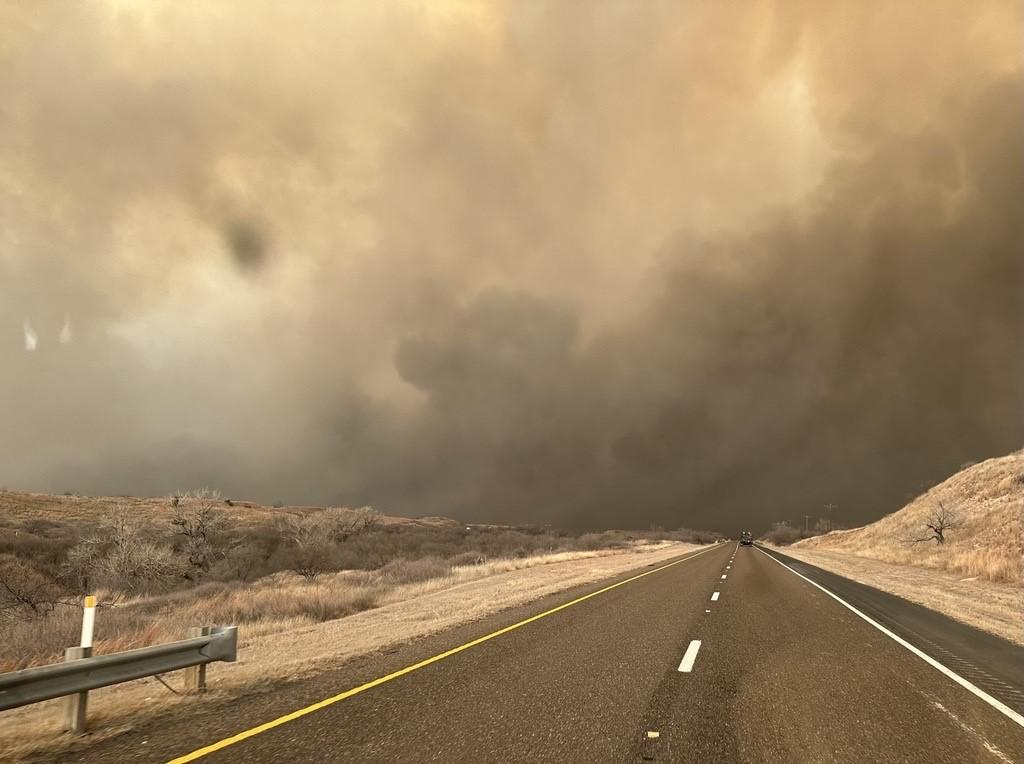
- Smokehouse Creek Fire

Impacts
- Deaths: 2

The 2024 Texas wildfires was a series of wildfires that burned throughout the U.S. state of Texas during 2024.

== Background ==
While "fire season" varies every year in Texas, most wildfires occur in between February and April. However, there is an increasing fire danger all year-round. Fire conditions can be exacerbated by drought, strong winds, La Niña, and vegetation growth. Climate change is leading to increased temperatures, lower humidity levels, and drought conditions that are happening more often.

== Summary ==
The 2024 Texas wildfires were marked by several major fires, including the Smokehouse Creek Fire in the Texas panhandle and part of Oklahoma.

The Smokehouse Creek Fire burned an estimated 1,058,482 acres (1,653.878 mi^{2}; 428,352 ha) in Texas and Oklahoma and was completely contained on March 16, becoming the second largest fire in US history dating back to 1988. It started on Monday, February 26, one mile north of Stinnett in Hutchinson County, Texas.

Other fires include the Windy Deuce Fire, which also started on February 26. As of March 3, it has burned 144,206 acres (225.322 mi^{2}; 58,358 ha), including a portion of Lake Meredith National Recreation Area, and it is 100% contained.

In addition, the Grape Vine Creek Fire started 9.5 miles south of Lefors in Gray County, Texas on the same day, burning an estimated 34,882 acres (54.503 mi^{2}; 14,116 ha) with 100% containment.

== List of wildfires ==
The following is a list of fires that burned more than 1,000 acres (400 ha), or produced significant structural damage or casualties.

Name	County	Acres	Start date	Containment date (Note: Containment means that fire crews have established and secured control lines around the fire's perimeter. These lines are artificial barriers, like trenches or cleared vegetation, designed to stop the fire's spread, or natural barriers like rivers. Containment reflects progress in managing the fire but does not necessarily mean the fire is starved of fuel, under control, or put out.)	Notes	Ref
North CIG	Moore	4,012	February 24	February 25		
Smokehouse Creek	Hemphill & Roberts	1,058,482	February 26	March 16	Two fatalities; largest wildfire in Texas history, second largest in U.S history	
Windy Deuce	Potter, Carson, Moore, Hutchinson	144,206	February 26	March 3		
Grape Vine Creek	Gray	34,883	February 26	March 10		
Juliet Pass	Armstrong	2,963	February 26	February 27		
Magenta	Oldham	3,297	February 27	March 5		
Mile Marker 32	Kenedy	1,424	April 19	April 24		
Laguna 24	Kleberg	12,385	May 11	May 18		
Hackberry Canyon	Potter	1,088	May 14	May 25		
Cattail 24	Kleberg	1,620	May 26	May 30		
West AER Motor	Cottle	1,761	July 31	August 2		
Paint Crossing	Throckmorton	2,263	August 7	August 12		
Robertson	Stephens	1,610	August 12	August 14		
Creek 232	Throckmorton	1,241	August 13	August 14		
Midway Pasture	Wilbarger	1,147	August 15	August 16		
Red Creek	Haskell	2,778	August 16	August 17		
Dirt Road	King	1,524	August 16	August 20		
Peter Switch	Wichita	1,658	August 18	August 19		
North Art Complex	Mason	4,355	August 22	August 25		

Perimeters of 2024 Texas wildfires (map data)

== Aftermath ==
At least two people died as a result of the fires and at least 7,000 cattle have died. Panhandle ranchers and farmers are seeking government assistance to recover from their losses. Volunteer organizations are assisting in the recovery efforts.

Following the fires, conspiracy theories spread stating that the fires were started by directed energy weapons which were ineffective against or deliberately did not target houses with blue roofs.

Investigations are underway to determine the cause of the largest wildfire, with attention on a downed Xcel Energy Co. power line near Stinnett as a potential ignition source. Lawsuits have been filed against Xcel Energy for alleged negligence leading to the fires.

== See also ==
- 2024 United States wildfires
- Wildfires in 2024
