= 2024 Virginia wildfires =

Natural disasters in the USA

Statistics
- Total fires: 411+
- Total area: 56,372 acres

Impacts
- Structures lost: 57 (including 29 houses)

The 2024 Virginia wildfire season was a series of wildfires that burned throughout the U.S. state of Virginia.

== Background ==
=== Spring fire season ===
The spring fire season generally runs from February 15 to April 30. During this time, vegetation remains dormant and dry from winter, while increasing warmth and strong winds contribute to rapid fire spread. Virginia enforces its "4 PM Burning Law"—which prohibits outdoor burning before 4:00 p.m.—throughout this period to reduce ignition risks and capitalize on the cooler, more humid late afternoon conditions.

=== Fall fire season ===
The fall (autumn) fire season typically spans mid-October to late November, when frost-killed undergrowth and fallen leaves serve as highly flammable surface fuels. Dry, breezy autumn days further enhance the risk of wildfire ignition and rapid progression.

=== Year-round risk ===
Wildfires in Virginia can occur year-round, but are most frequent during these two peak periods. The Virginia Department of Forestry (DOF) attributes the majority of wildfires to escaped debris burning, and emphasizes public adherence to safe burning practices and local burn restrictions to prevent human-caused incidents.

Climate trends are further exacerbating wildfire risk. Rising average temperatures and extended periods of low humidity are increasing the frequency of "fire weather" days, especially in northern and western Virginia. These changing conditions are drying fuels more quickly and intensifying both spring and fall fire seasons.

== Summary ==
During the 2024 spring wildfire season between February 15 to April 30, at least 411 wildfires burnt "nearly 20,000 acres" [CONVERT], the largest area burned in the last 30 years in that time period, and nearly ten times as much as the 2023 Spring season with 2,174 acres. Factors that exacerbated wildfires in 2024 included "extended dry spells and persistent winds".

== List of wildfires ==
The following is a list of fires that burned more than 1,000 acres (400 ha), or produced significant structural damage or casualties.

Name	County	Acres	Start date	Containment date ontainmented date (Note: Containment means that fire crews have established and secured control lines around the fire's perimeter. These lines are artificial barriers, like trenches or cleared vegetation, designed to stop the fire's spread, or natural barriers like rivers. Containment reflects progress in managing the fire but does not necessarily mean the fire is starved of fuel, under control, or put out.)	Notes	Ref
211 West	Shenandoah and Page	6,399	March 20	March 27	Part of the 2024 North Area Complex with the Capon/Brush Run Fire, the Waites Run Fire, the Edith Gap/Serenity Ridge Fire, and the Cove Mountain Fire.	
Brushy Run	Rockingham	6,223	March 20	March 27	Part of the 2024 North Area Complex.	
Rocky Branch	Page	1,031	March 20	April 3	Estimated cost: $400,000	

Perimeters of 2024 Virginia wildfires (map data)

== See also ==
- 2024 United States wildfires
