= 2026 Georgia wildfires =

Series of wildfires

The 2026 Georgia wildfires are a series of active wildfires currently ongoing in Georgia.

== Background ==
While "fire season" varies every year in Georgia, most wildfires occur in between January and April, with a second, smaller peak in the fall (October–December). Fire conditions can be exacerbated by drought, strong winds, and vegetation growth. Climate change is leading to increased temperatures, lower humidity levels, and drought conditions that are happening more often.

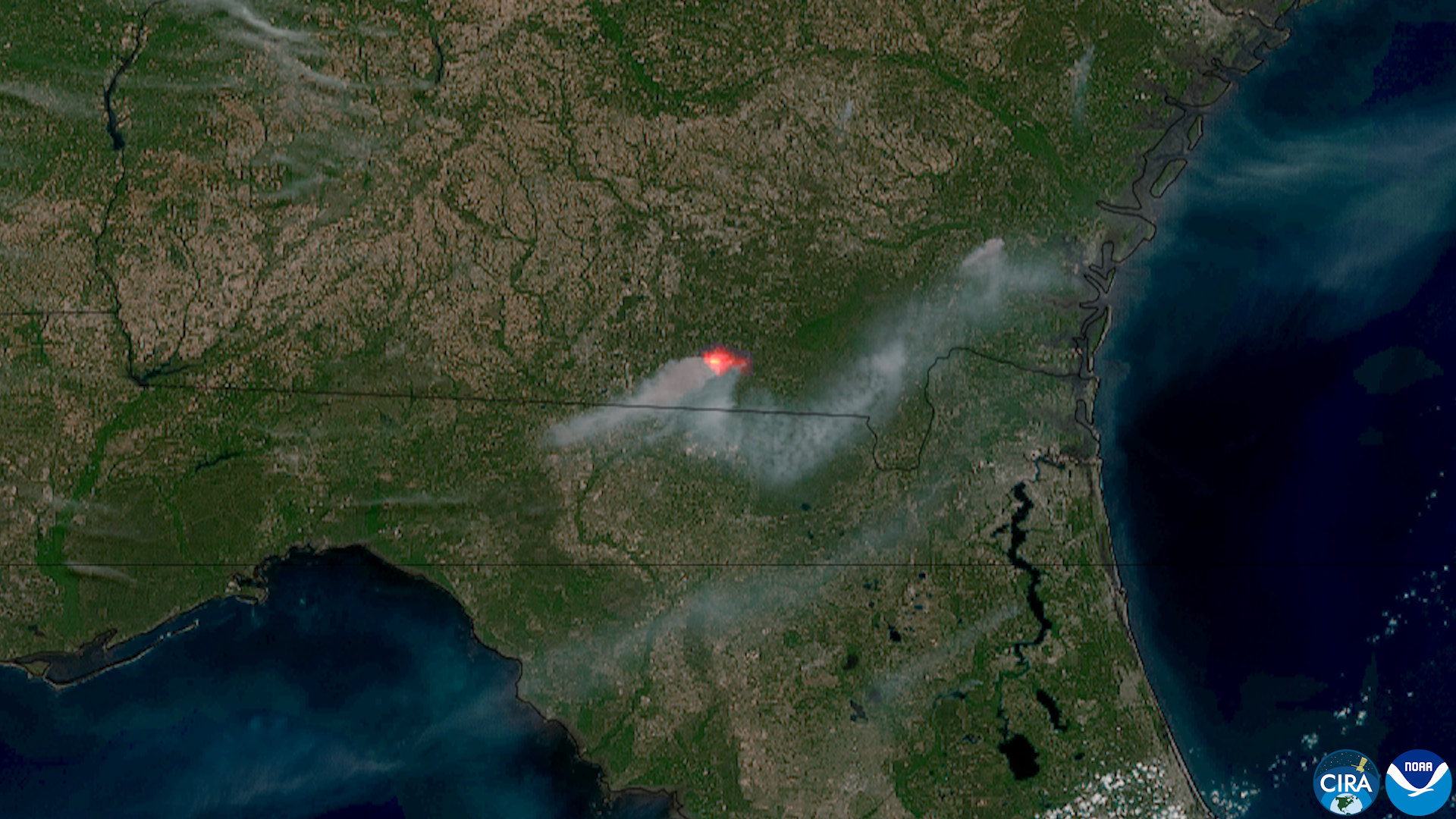
The Pineland Road fire on April 23 as viewed on satellite imagery producing smoke in south-west Georgia.

In February, a deficit of rain occurred across the southern half of the state which resulted in drought conditions, and by April, had significantly intensified into D3 (extreme) and pockets of D4 (exceptional) drought. Several fires sparked halfway into the month due to consistent red flag warning conditions, with two fires (Pineland Road fire and Highway 82 Fire) ending up growing to become quite large for the state and caused considerable destruction.

== List of wildfires ==
The following are a list of fires that burned more than 1,000 acres (400 ha), produced significant structural damage, or resulted in casualties.

Name	County	Acres	Start date	Containment date	Notes	Ref.
Lamar Bennett Trail	Ware	1,075	March 29	March 30		
Sargent	Clinch, Baker (FL), Columbia (FL)	2,523	April 2	June 3		
Pineland Road	Clinch, Echols	32,031	April 18	June 10	Caused evacuations for the community of Fruitland and destroyed at least 30 structures.	
Highway 82	Brantley, Wayne	22,420	April 20	June 10	At least 100 structures have been destroyed, caused numerous evacuations for the town of Atkinson, Manningtown, Waynesville, Browntown and surrounding communities.	
