= 2024 Florida wildfires =

Natural disasters in the USA

- Date: February 21, 2024 - December 2024

Statistics
- Total fires: 1,100+
- Burned area: 24,000+ acres

Impacts
- Deaths: 1

The 2024 Florida wildfire season was series of wildfires that burned throughout the U.S. state of Florida. As of June 2, 2024, over 1,100 fires were reported, burning over 24,000 acres of land, according to the Florida Forest Service. The remains of one person were found in Southern Florida while Pompano Beach firefighters were extinguishing a brush fire on June 2.

== Background ==
Florida's wildfire season is shaped by its subtropical climate, seasonal rainfall shifts, human activity, and occasionally catastrophic weather events. The state traditionally experiences a prolonged dry season from October through May, during which wildfire risks are elevated. Central Florida and northern Florida typically sees its wildfire trends begin as early as January, with activity continuing into May or even early June—right before the onset of the rainy season and hurricane impacts.

Lightning is a potent natural ignition source—but its role is often overshadowed by human-caused fires, particularly those that originate from escaped yard debris burning and equipment sparks. In 2023, lightning accounted for more than 35% of wildfires, but the remainder were traced to human activities.

Florida's ecosystems—such as pine flatwoods and scrub—evolved with recurrent fire cycles, typically burning every 3 to 7 years to maintain ecological health. These fire-adapted landscapes depend on periodic burns to sustain species like the gopher tortoise and regenerating longleaf pine stands.

Major wildfire years have occurred in the past. One of the most destructive was the 1998 Florida wildfires, a series of thousands of fires sparked mostly by lightning and exacerbated by heavy vegetation growth followed by sudden drought conditions. These blazes scorched roughly 500,000 acres—including over 150 structures—before rains eventually helped contain them.

In recent years, wildfire seasons have remained active and in some cases expanded. Throughout 2023, over 2,600 wildfire incidents in Florida burned more than 101,000 acres. This year was fueled by La Niña-induced dryness, precipitation shortfalls, and vegetation damage from Hurricane Ian, prompting burn bans and Red Flag Warnings in many counties.

Hurricanes leave behind another major and often overlooked risk factor: downed trees and debris. These serve as abundant dry fuel. Experts warn that when combined with ongoing drought and drought-induced dryness, these remnants contribute significantly to early and intense fire outbreaks each spring.

== Meteorological synopsis ==
Several factors caused the fire season in Florida to become very active, including above-average temperatures, below-average rainfall, and vegetation damage from tropical cyclones. Keetch–Byram Drought Index (KBDI) levels in Lee, Collier, and Hendry counties have reached levels over 700, indicating a very high fire danger and exceptionally dry conditions. Rainfall deficits reached as high as 4–8 inches (100–200 mm).

== List of wildfires ==
The following is a list of fires that burned more than 1,000 acres (400 ha), or produced significant structural damage or casualties.

| Name | County | Acres | Start date | Containment date (Note: Containment means that fire crews have established and secured control lines around the fire's perimeter. These lines are artificial barriers, like trenches or cleared vegetation, designed to stop the fire's spread, or natural barriers like rivers. Containment reflects progress in managing the fire but does not necessarily mean the fire is starved of fuel, under control, or put out.) | Notes | Ref |
|---|---|---|---|---|---|---|
| RADAR | Polk | 1,300 | February 20 | March 1 | A human-caused wildfire. | |
| Brushy Crossing | Liberty | 2,215 | March 2 | 2024 | Caused at least $40,000 in damage. | |
| Olive Branch 664 | Hardee | 1,400 | May 29 | June 6 | | |
| River Ranch | Polk | 3,822 | June 6 | June 14 | Firefighters split the fire into Sections A and B. | |

Perimeters of 2024 Florida wildfires (map data)

== See also ==
- 2024 United States wildfires
