= 2024 Colorado wildfires =

Natural disasters in the USA

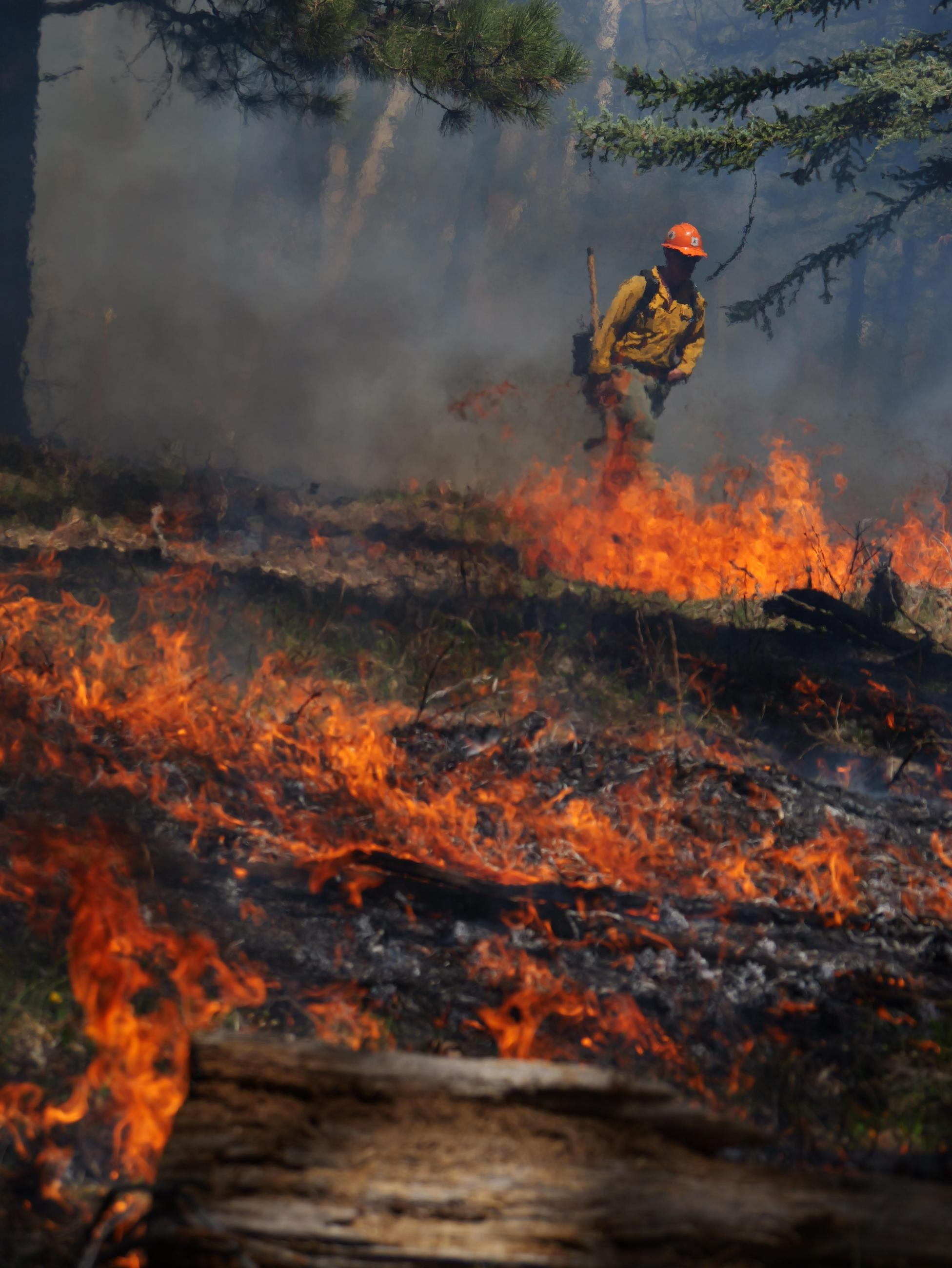
- The Spruce Creek Fire, which burnt 5,699 acres of land in the San Juan National Forest

The 2024 Colorado wildfire season was a series of wildfires that burned in the U.S. state of Colorado during 2024.

== Background ==
While "fire season" varies every year in Colorado, most wildfires occur in between May and September, but there is a fire risk year-round. Large wildfires have become more common mostly because of drought, high winds, and vegetation growth. Climate change has increased temperatures and decreased humidity in Colorado and sometimes reduces spring snowmelt, both of which contribute to fire conditions.

== Summary ==
By early August, Colorado tallied a substantial share of wildfire activity across the western United States, with the Front Range region particularly hard hit. The Bucktail Fire, which began on August 1 in Montrose County, ultimately burned 7,202 acres, making it the second-largest blaze of the season and causing criminal charges when it was found to have been accidentally started during an attempt to cremate a dog. Even earlier, the Spruce Creek Fire, ignited by lightning in mid-May near Dolores, charred 5,699 acres—the season's first major wildfire—before being fully contained by the end of May.

That spring and summer period was marked by volatile conditions, with rapid fire spread spurred by dry fuels, high winds, and low humidity. The Alexander Mountain Fire, which started near Loveland in late July, burned over 9,000 acres and destroyed dozens of homes, prompting aggressive containment strategies including backburning near Drake. Another grim development occurred along the Front Range, where the Stone Canyon Fire, at roughly 1,500 acres, killed one person and destroyed five structures, leading officials to caution that resources were stretched thin across multiple simultaneous incidents.

== List of wildfires ==
The following is a list of fires that burned more than 1,000 acres (400 ha), or produced significant structural damage or casualties.

Name	County	Acres	Start date	Containment date (Note: Containment means that fire crews have established and secured control lines around the fire's perimeter. These lines are artificial barriers, like trenches or cleared vegetation, designed to stop the fire's spread, or natural barriers like rivers. Containment reflects progress in managing the fire but does not necessarily mean the fire is starved of fuel, under control, or put out.)	Notes	Ref
Range 153	El Paso	1,816	February 25	March 5	Human-caused about 10 miles (16 km) southwest of Fountain.	
Range 135	El Paso	7,744	February 29	March 5		
Boggsville	Bent	1,062	March 2	March 18	Burned about 2 miles (3.2 km) south of Las Animas. Closed State Highway 101 and U.S. Route 50 and prompted evacuations for Las Animas.	
Range 127	El Paso	1,132	April 15	May 13	Human-caused. Burned near Fort Carson.	
Spruce Creek	Montezuma	5,699	May 14	May 31	Caused by lightning 11 miles (18 km) northeast of Dolores.	
Rabbit Valley	Mesa	1,505	June 17	June 20	Burned near Utah border	
Oak Ridge	Pueblo, Custer	1,310	June 22	July 24	Caused by lightning 3 miles (4.8 km) northeast of Beulah.	
104	Weld	1,782	July 28	July 31		
Alexander Mountain	Larimer	9,668	July 29	August 17		
Stone Canyon	Boulder	1,557	July 30	August 4	Burned outside of Lyons. Destroyed six structure and killed one person. Undetermined cause.	
Bucktail	Montrose	7,078	August 1	August 21	Started by a man attempting to cremate his dog. Damaged one structure.	
Big Gulch	Moffat	1,164	August 7	August 9	Likely caused by lightning.	
Wildhorse 5	Weld	1,200	September 29	October 1	Human-caused. Burned 10 miles (16 km) north of Briggsdale in Pawnee National Grassland.	

Perimeters of 2024 Colorado wildfires (map data)

== See also ==
- 2024 United States wildfires
- Wildfires in 2024
