= 2024 Oklahoma wildfires =

Natural disasters in the USA

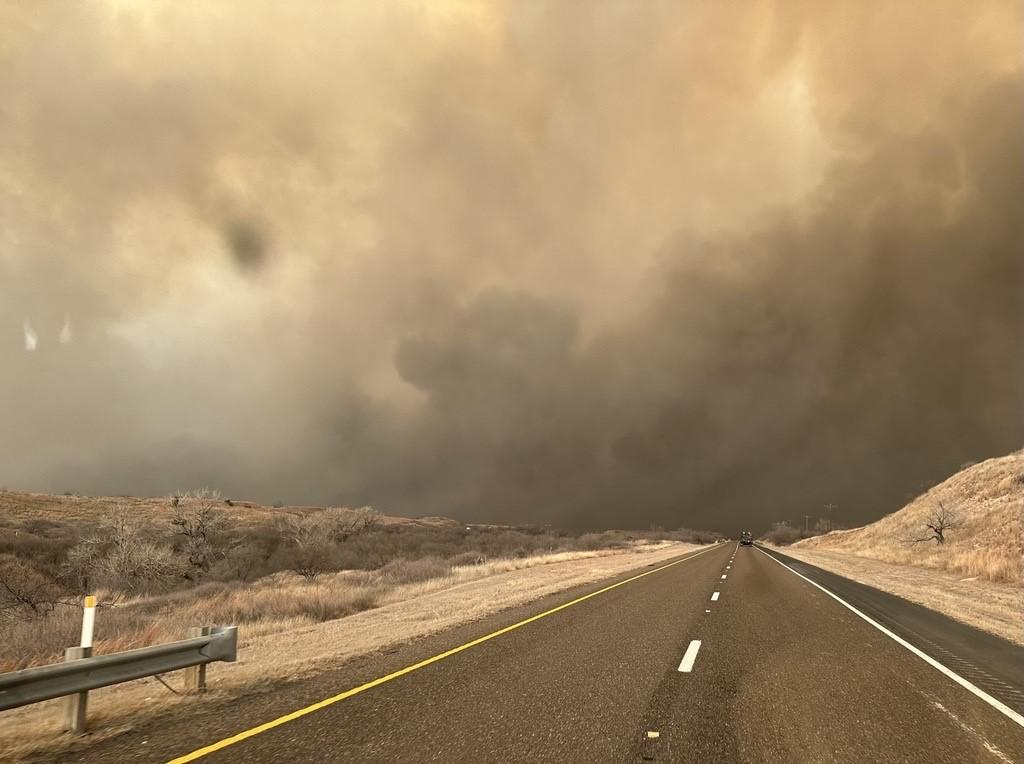
- The Smokehouse Creek Fire on February 27, 2024, which started in Texas but spread to Oklahoma

The 2024 Oklahoma wildfire season was a series of notable wildfires that burned throughout the U.S. state of Oklahoma during 2024.

== Background ==
"Fire season" in Oklahoma typically occurs in the early and late months of the year, such as November or March. Due to the grassy fuels in Oklahoma, one of the main factors that pushes fires is wind and dry fuels. Peak fire season is usually in March, the windiest month on record for Oklahoma.

== List of wildfires ==
The following is a list of fires that burned more than 1,000 acres (400 ha), or produced significant structural damage or casualties.

Name	County	Acres	Start date	Containment date (Note: Containment means that fire crews have established and secured control lines around the fire's perimeter. These lines are artificial barriers, like trenches or cleared vegetation, designed to stop the fire's spread, or natural barriers like rivers. Containment reflects progress in managing the fire but does not necessarily mean the fire is starved of fuel, under control, or put out.)	Notes	Ref
Nature	Cherokee	3,542	February 25	2024		
Sand Creek	Harper	2,645	February 26	2024	Caused by human activity.	
Slapout	Beaver	22,826	February 27	2024		
Catesby	Ellis	77,626	February 27	2024	Caused by human activity.	
Flying G	Tulsa	1,110	March 17	April 1		
Blue Star	McIntosh	1,318	October 9	October 12		
Rush	Comanche	12,488	October 24	November 8		
Euchee Creek	Payne	1,279	October 29	November 4		
Cimarron Bend	Logan	2,112	October 29	November 1		
Unknown	Lincoln	1,130	October 29	October 30		
North Road	Osage	3,584	October 29	November 5		
Indian Creek	Dewey	1,575	October 29	November 1		

Perimeters of wildfires in Oklahoma during 2024 (Red: >1000 acres) (map data)

== See also ==
- 2024 United States wildfires
