= 2024 Northeastern United States wildfires =

Natural disasters in the USA

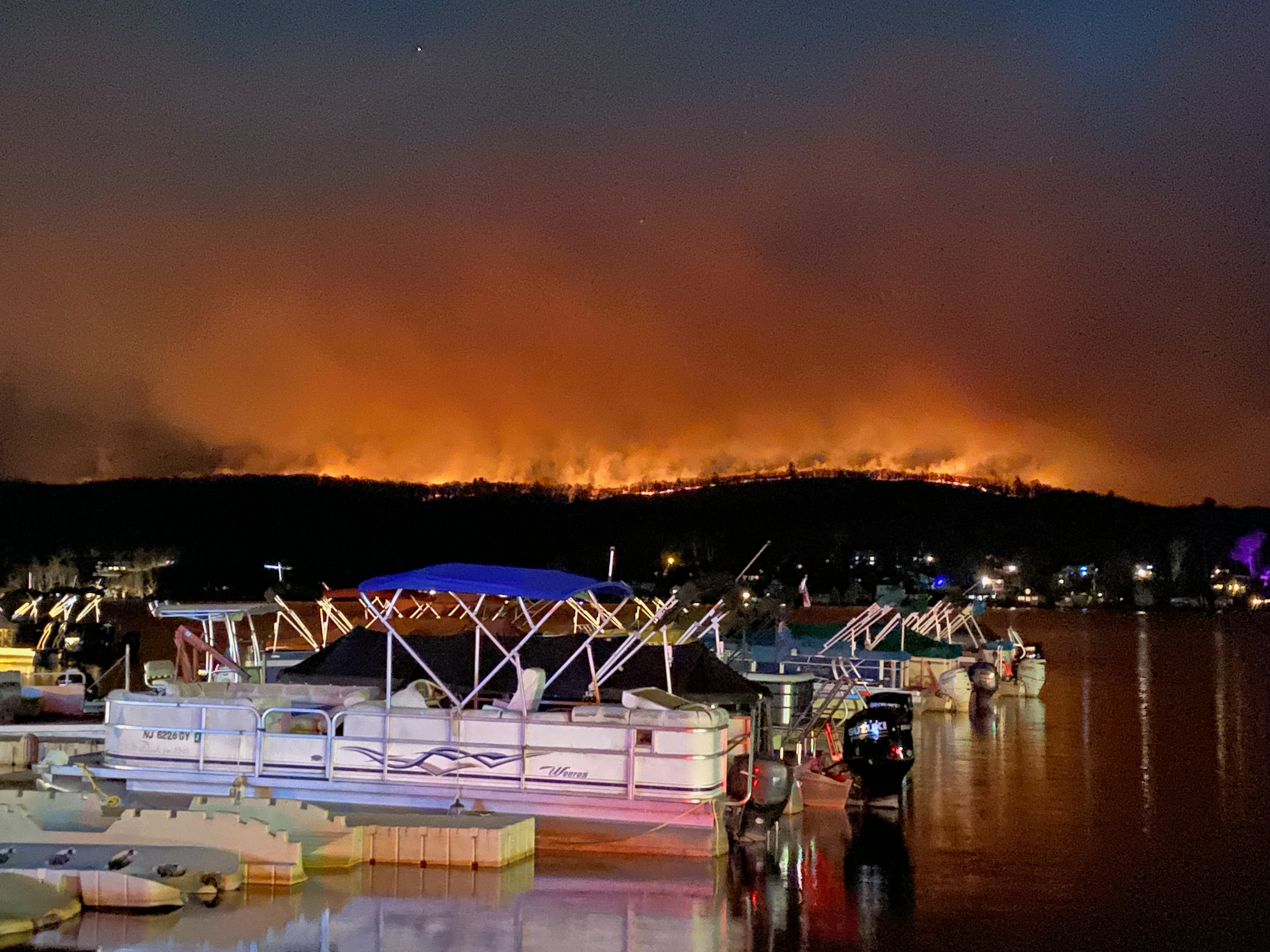
- Jennings Creek wildfire on November 9 near Greenwood Lake, New Jersey

Statistics
- Total fires: 400+ (Note: Only includes New Jersey wildfires)
- Burned area: 7,700+ acres

Impacts
- Deaths: 2

The 2024 Northeast wildfires were a series of destructive wildfires in the Northeastern United States in the autumn of 2024. Many of these wildfires were caused and worsened by the ongoing drought in the region.

== Background ==
Drought in the Northeast began to form following a dry autumn in 2024. September 2024 was the driest on record at Islip, New York and Wilmington, Delaware, with numerous other sites recording a top-10 dry September across the region. Drought significantly expanded in the Northeast following a record-dry October, which in many places, was also the driest month on record. Philadelphia reached a record long rainless streak during this time. High temperatures in the Northeast further worsened drought conditions, with much of New England reaching a record high temperature on November 6. By November 7, over half of the New York metropolitan area was in moderate drought, with three-quarters of New Jersey in severe drought. Extreme drought had also affected portions of New Jersey, Maryland and Pennsylvania. These extremely dry conditions allowed for fires to form and spread across the Northeast.

== Summary and impacts ==
While wildfires in the Northeast began as early as July 5, the record dryness of September and October allowed them to significantly expand. From October 1 to November 11, over 537 reports of wildfires were received in New Jersey, with 60 in New York, burning 4,500 and 2,100 acres (1,820 and 850 ha), respectively. Across the state of Connecticut in late October, 70 wildfires were reported. One such fire, the Hawthorne Fire, resulted in a firefighter being killed on October 22, with two others being injured. By November 1, a statewide burn ban was issued in Maryland.

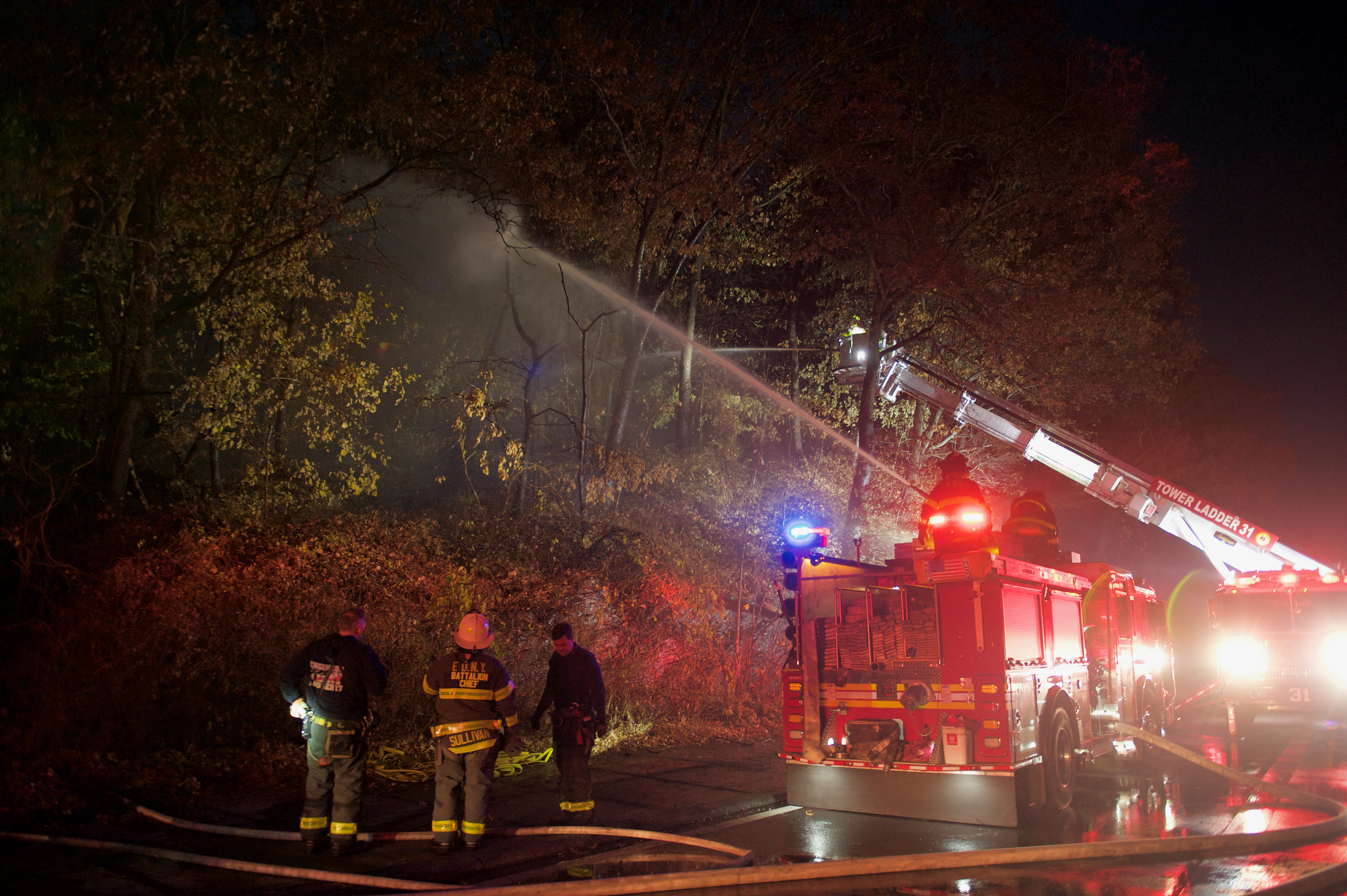
Firefighters put out a brush fire in Highbridge Park, Manhattan

Following multiple wildfires in the region and a two-alarm wildfire in Prospect Park, mayor Eric Adams banned all grilling in New York City on November 9. Just one day prior to the ban, the Jennings Creek wildfire started in Orange County, New York near the border of Passaic County, New Jersey. An 18-year old New York forest ranger was killed trying to put out the fire. The wildfire spread quickly and led to businesses and roads being closed. Another wildfire in the state, the Whitehouse Fire caused $20,000 in damage and an injury. The wildfires also led to poor air quality across the region, with the air quality index reaching 201 in New York City late on November 9. While light rain fell in New Jersey from November 10 to 11th, including up to 0.23 in (5.8 mm) in Trenton and 0.19 in (4.8 mm) in Newark, the rain failed to provide much relief for the wildfires. New York City suffered a record number of wildfires from October 29 to November 12. Amtrak service was suspended for 24 hours on November 12-13 between Penn Station and New Haven, Connecticut due to brush fires.

By November 18, many wildfires in the Northeast were beginning to be contained, with the Jennings Creek Fire reaching 90% containment. However, to facilitate in containment, a voluntary evacuation order was issued for Warwick, New York. On November 19, the Butternut Fire formed at Great Barrington in Massachusetts and by November 20, the fire grew to 1,100 acres (450 ha). However, on November 21, significant rain and snow significantly reduced the fire threat, with many locations across New York, Connecticut and New Jersey receiving over 2 in (51 mm) of rain, and with snowfall accumulations up to 20 in (51 cm) in High Point, New Jersey.

On November 22, with help from rain and snowfall that week, the Jennings Creek wildfire was fully contained, leaving 5,304 acres (2,146 ha) burned across New York and New Jersey. The Butternut Fire was declared to be contained on December 1.
