= 2024 Wyoming wildfires =

Natural disasters in the USA

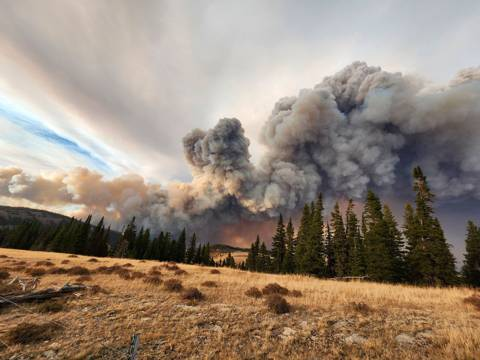
- The Elk Fire in Sheridan County on September 30th, 2024.

The 2024 Wyoming wildfire season was a series of wildfires that burned throughout the U.S. state of Wyoming during 2024.

== Background ==
"Wildfire season" in Wyoming typically occurs between June and September, but wildfires can occur as early as April and late as December. Peak time of fire season is normally in July and August. Wildfires in Wyoming are triggered by a dry climate, drought, grasses die and dry out, and times when dry thunderstorms are more common. Humidity levels, dryness of fuel, wind, and temperature also play a crucial role. Forests that have not had wildfires in recent years have more fire fuel, and trees killed by disease and insect infestation quickly dry up and become a prime fuel for wildfires.

== Summary ==
By late August 2024, Wyoming experienced one of its most severe wildfire seasons in decades, with over 810,000 acres burned—second only to the 1988 Yellowstone fires. Dry conditions, high winds, and abundant fuel contributed to rapid fire spread across grasslands, forests, and mountainous regions.

The largest and most destructive blaze was the Elk Fire in Sheridan County, which scorched approximately 98,352 acres in the Bighorn National Forest. The fire prompted evacuations and threatened critical infrastructure, including the Little Bighorn Canyon. Firefighting efforts were complicated by rugged terrain and challenging weather conditions.

Other significant fires included the Pack Trail Fire, which burned 89,930 acres across Teton and Fremont counties before merging with the Fish Creek Fire on October 5. The Short Draw Fire in Campbell County consumed 34,557 acres, and the La Bonte Fire in Converse County burned 3,506 acres.

The 2024 wildfire season placed a significant strain on Wyoming’s firefighting resources and finances. State Forester Kelly Norris described the season as “massive,” highlighting the challenges posed by extreme weather and extensive fuel loads.

State and federal agencies coordinated efforts to manage and suppress the fires, prioritizing protection of communities and critical infrastructure. The 2024 season underscored the increasing frequency and intensity of wildfires in Wyoming and prompted discussions on long-term mitigation and resource allocation.

== List of wildfires ==
The following is a list of fires that burned more than 1,000 acres (400 ha), or produced significant structural damage or casualties.

Name	County	Acres	Start date	Containment date (Note: Containment means that fire crews have established and secured control lines around the fire's perimeter. These lines are artificial barriers, like trenches or cleared vegetation, designed to stop the fire's spread, or natural barriers like rivers. Containment reflects progress in managing the fire but does not necessarily mean the fire is starved of fuel, under control, or put out.)	Notes	Ref
352 I-80	Laramie	2,193	February 24	March 25		
Hwy 16	Crook	1,200	February 25			
Happy Jack	Laramie	6,524	March 1	July 3	Caused by human activity.	
139	Laramie	2,017	March 2	March 26	Caused by human activity.	
Creek	Crook	1,470	June 11	June 20		
Pine Ridge	Goshen	1,290	June 24	June 28	Caused by lightning.	
Road 22	Goshen	5,576	July 13	July 15		
Oregon Trail	Natrona	1,540	July 13	July 22		
Clearwater	Park	1,966	July 19	December	Lightning-caused.	
Badger	Sheridan	7,973	July 24	August 29		
Beaver Creek	Campbell	1,081	July 28	August 31	Lightning-caused.	
Blizzard Heights	Converse	1,957	July 28	July 29	Lightning-caused.	
Cold Springs	Converse	1,846	July 30	September 24		
Deer Creek	Johnson	6,700	August 3	August 9		
Fish Creek	Teton & Fremont	25,443	August 16		Caused by lightning. Merged with the Pack Trail Fire on October 5.	
Constitution	Campbell	24,630	August 21	September 14		
Geier	Weston	1,474	August 21	September 24		
Barber	Converse	1,419	August 21	September 24		
House Draw	Johnson	174,547	August 21	September 17		
Flat Rock	Campbell	52,421	August 21	September 25		
Pleasant Valley	Platte & Goshen	28,984	July 30	August 7		
Remington	Sheridan	196,368	August 22	September 21	Spread into Montana. Destroyed several structures, ranches, and killed livestock. Became largest wildfire of Montana's wildfire season. Injured one civilian.	
Silver Spoon	Campbell	1,721	September 1	September 7		
West Warm Springs	Hot Springs	1,610	September 9	September 13		
Short Draw	Campbell	34,557	September 11	September 20		
Salt Creek	Natrona	1,520	September 11	September 11		
Bear Creek	Albany	1,444	September 12	September 20		
La Bonte	Converse	3,506	September 12	September 25		
Livingston Draw	Johnson	1,400	September 17	September 23		
Elk	Sheridan	98,352	September 27	November 14	One firefighter injured.	
Pack Trail	Teton & Fremont	89,930	September 27	November 7	Merged with the Fish Creek Fire on October 5.	
Diamond	Platte	2,168	October 22	October 23		

Perimeters of 2024 Wyoming wildfires (map data)
