= Highway 82 Fire =

2026 Georgia (U.S. state) wildfire

- Part of the 2026 Georgia wildfires
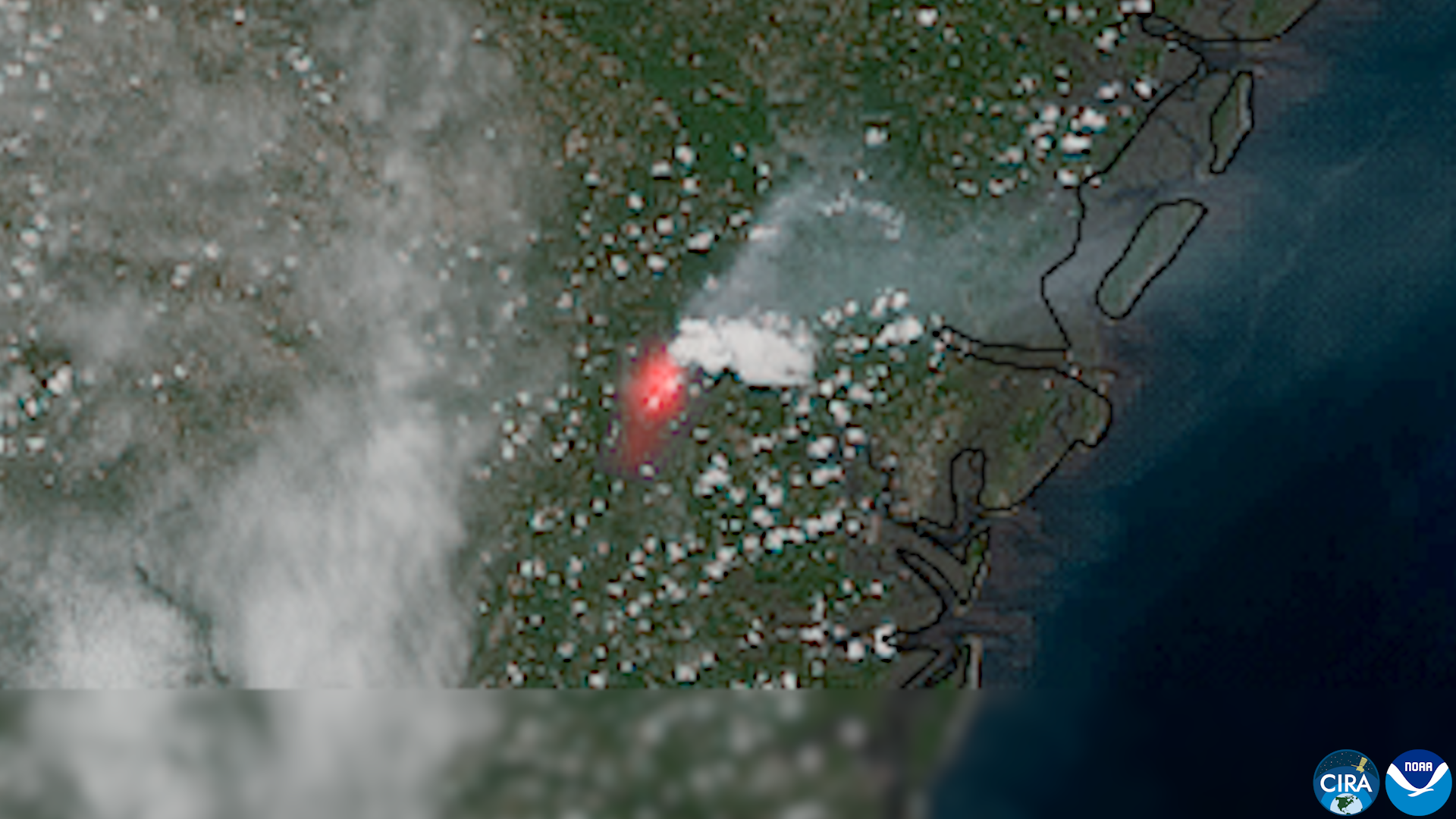
- Pyrocumulus cloud from the fire during the day on April 22 as viewed on satellite imagery
- Date: April 20, 2026 – May 20, 2026
- Location: Brantley County, Camden County, Wayne County, and Glynn County, Georgia
- Coordinates: 31°12′N 81°59′W

Statistics
- Perimeter: 100% contained
- Burned area: 22,419 acres (9,073 ha)

Impacts
- Deaths: 0
- Injuries: 0
- Evacuated: 5,000+
- Structures destroyed: 130+ (90 business/residential, 55 smaller buildings)
- Cost: $20,000,000 USD

Ignition
- Cause: Balloon contacting powerline

Map
- Perimeter map of Highway 82 Fire (map data)

The Highway 82 Fire was a major wildfire burning in the southeastern part of the U.S. state of Georgia, close to the coast. As of June 2026, it is currently 22,419 acres and 100% contained. The wildfire started near U.S. Route 82, becoming its namesake. On April 27, 2026, this fire and the Pineland Road Fire were deemed the most destructive in Georgia history during an outbreak of wildfires affecting both Florida and Georgia.

== Background ==
Prior to the fire's start, the entire state of Georgia was in at least moderate drought, with the entire southern half of the state in extreme to exceptional drought. A burn ban was issued for the entire state as well in result.

== Progression ==
The fire started at approximately 5:00 pm on April 20 due to a Mylar balloon making contact with a power line, causing electricity to set the vegetation around it alight. Upon ignition, the fire caused evacuations for houses along highway 110 and grew to around 700 acres by the end of the afternoon. Firefighters brought the fire's containment up to 75% by the end of the day and were stationed overnight.

The next day, dry gusty winds and very low relative humidity caused the fire to jump containment lines and burn to the east towards Atkinson, prompting numerous evacuations as the fire destroyed structures on the east side of town. Containment was revised to 20% following the new growth and the fire was estimated at 1,500 acres. Overnight, the fire continued to grow as it reached 5,000 acres and containment was all of the way down to 10%, with over 200 personnel battling the blaze.

=== April 23–27 ===
By April 23, the fire continued to grow at a more moderate pace to the north and east, as resources "from all over south Georgia" were on the front lines. Acreage did not increase until 8pm when the fire intensified again, but reported heavy smoke and dust were hampering containment efforts of the fire and the building of containment lines. The next morning, crews closed Highway 82 due to more heavy smoke from the active flames. The fire made another push north throughout the day, then a wind shift in the evening pushed the fire west up past Stewart Road with additional evacuations for Browntown Road and a Red Cross Shelter being opened in Brunswick. Aircraft operations were ongoing, as well as a firing operation that helped strengthen containment lines on the fire's Eastern side.

The fire was over 9,000 acres having been mapped overnight by an aircraft operation. Stronger northerly winds pushed more smoke onto roadways causing more closures. Later in the day, the fire prompted more evacuations for most of Browntown Road and the Wayne-Brantly county line as the fire moved north at a rapid pace. Significant growth and extreme fire behavior was observed on the eastern parameter of the fire as it slopped over Browntown Road in multiple locations and continued to move to the east, causing an evacuation order and warning in Glynn county. Flames lengths were recorded to be over 150 feet high. On the western side of the parameter, fire was reported to be behind houses and structure protection was in place throughout the day as erratic fire challenged firefighters. By the late evening, the head of the fire moving north spotted across State Route 32 and nearly made it into Wayne County, where more evacuations were in place, including the entire village of Manningtown. In one day, the fire had doubled in size to over 18,000 acres and containment was revised to 7%, which was the lowest since the fire began.

=== April 27 onward ===
Fire growth slowed on the Highway 82 Fire, as it was mapped at 22,000 acres on the 27th, and crews were working hard to mop up hotspots and establish containment. Most fire activity was still on the inside of the fire perimeter when growth completely stopped on the 28th. Fire behavior was minimal by the beginning of May, with up to an inch of rain falling on the fire perimeter. Conditions were more favorable with operations, as over 600 personnel were working hotspots, but most of the evacuations remained in place. Due to the heavy equipment and personnel on scene, evacuations were gradually reduced to lower statuses. According to crews on the front lines, the fire was still smoldering on the interior of the parameter in organic soils.

Containment continued to increase throughout the month of May, and by June that number reached 100%. Over 350 homes were saved from the fire.

== Impacts ==
Smoke from the Highway 82 and Pineland Road fires greatly impacted air quality in southern Georgia, with some areas being listed as hazardous by the air quality index. Alongside residential evacuations, the fire forced the evacuations of multiple schools.

Damage surveys say approximately 90 homes were destroyed by the Highway 82 Fire, but no injuries or fatalities resulted. The fire's response was noted as "massive" by a chief commander in firefighting and its destruction was historic.
