= Spruce Creek Fire =

2024 wildfire in Colorado, USA

- Part of the 2024 Colorado wildfires
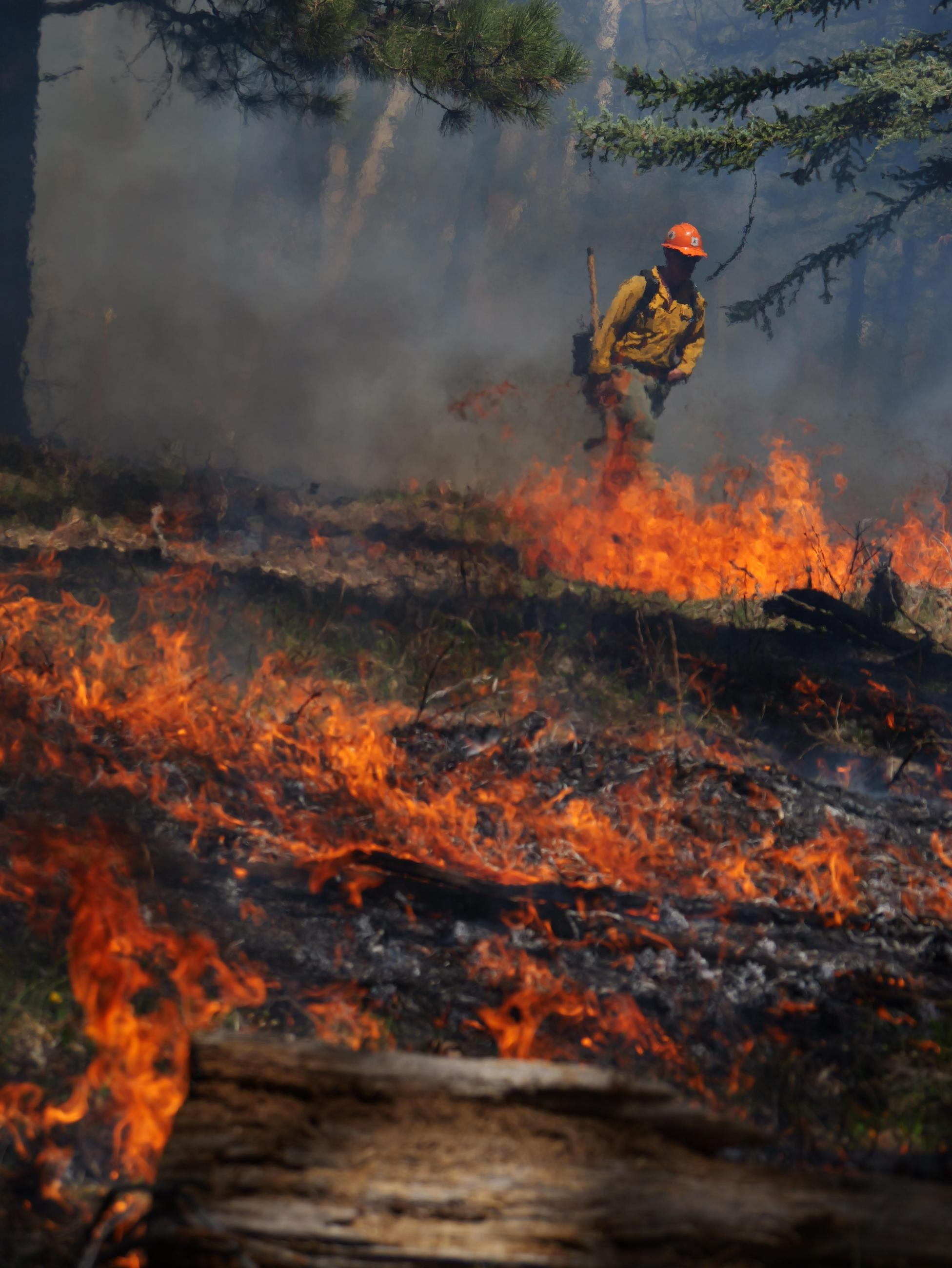
- A member of the Roosevelt Interagency Hotshot Crew at the fire on May 19
- Date: May 14, 2024 –; May 31, 2024

Statistics
- Perimeter: 100% contained
- Burned area: 5,699 acres (2,306 ha; 9 sq mi; 23 km^{2})

Impacts
- Deaths: 0
- Injuries: 0

Ignition
- Cause: Lightning

The Spruce Creek Fire was a wildfire that burned in Montezuma County, in the U.S. State of Colorado. It was active from May 14 until May 31, 2024, when it was declared 100% contained. It was the first fire of the 2024 Colorado wildfire season, and is currently the 2nd-largest as of August 2.

== Progression ==
The fire started on May 14, approximately 11 miles northeast of Dolores. From then to May 22, the fire rapidly spread, reaching 1,644 and then1,867 acres in coverage by the late hours of May 22. 172 personnel were assigned to the fire. Firefighters secured northern and western fire perimeters, and protected historic sites threatened by the fire. By May 23, the fire had reached 4,672 acres, and on May 24, the fire had rapidly grown to 5,699 acres, its maximum size. Firefighters shifted to containment of the fire on roads, and two aerial ignition teams were put into place to aid with the task.

On May 25, the fire was declared 43% contained, and the number of personnel responding to the fire, dropped to 168. A bulldozer was dispatched to repair roads damaged on covered as a result of the fire. Fire activity began to slow down on May 26, and containment on the fires jumped to 63%. The bulldozer that was dispatched the day prior cleared roads in the Haycamp Mesa area.

By May 27, the fire was 73% contained and fire crews patrolled the fire's outer perimeter, to contain it within its footprint. Firefighters were able to contain 83% of the fire by May 28, and the area was reopened to the public. The fire was then transferred back into the hands of the San Juan National Forest services, and the fire was deemed 100% contained by May 31.

== Growth and containment table ==
Date	Area burned	Personnel	Containment
May 22	1,867 acres (8 km^{2})	172	
May 24	5,699 acres (23 km^{2})	172	
May 25	5,699 acres (23 km^{2})	168	
May 26	5,699 acres (23 km^{2})	173	
May 27	5,699 acres (23 km^{2})	167	
May 28	5,699 acres (23 km^{2})	146	
May 29	5,699 acres (23 km^{2})	Unknown	
May 30	5,699 acres (23 km^{2})	Unknown	
May 31	5,699 acres (23 km^{2})	Unknown	
