= Piney =

Piney may refer to:

== Places ==
=== United States ===
- Piney, Arkansas (disambiguation)
- Piney Buttes, Montana, a set of buttes
- Piney, Oklahoma, a census designated place
- Piney Township, Pennsylvania
- Piney River (disambiguation)
- Piney Creek (disambiguation)
- Piney Woods, an ecoregion in the southern United States

=== Elsewhere ===
- Rural Municipality of Piney, Manitoba, Canada
  - Piney, Manitoba, a community within the municipality
- Piney, Aube, France, a commune

== Other uses ==
- Duc de Piney, a title in the peerage of France; see Duke of Piney-Luxembourg
- nickname of Joseph Armone (1917-1992), American mobster and member of the Gambino crime family
- Piney Gir, often shortened to Piney, American musician and singer born Angela Penhaligon
- Piney (Pine Barrens resident), a term for a resident of the New Jersey Pine Barrens
- Piney Winston, a character in the American television series Sons of Anarchy
- Piney thistle, a species of perennial herb native to the Mediterranean basin
- Piney varnish tree, a species of tree endemic to the Western Ghats mountains in India

== See also ==
- Big Piney (disambiguation)
