= Big Pine =

Big Pine or Big Pines may refer to:

- Big Pine, California, an unincorporated community
- Big Pines, California, an unincorporated community
- Big Pine Creek (disambiguation)
- Big Pine Lake (Isanti County, Minnesota), a lake in Minnesota
- Big Pine Mountain, a mountain in California
- Big Pine Reservation
