= Airport Fire =

2024 wildfire in Southern California, US

- Part of the 2024 California wildfires
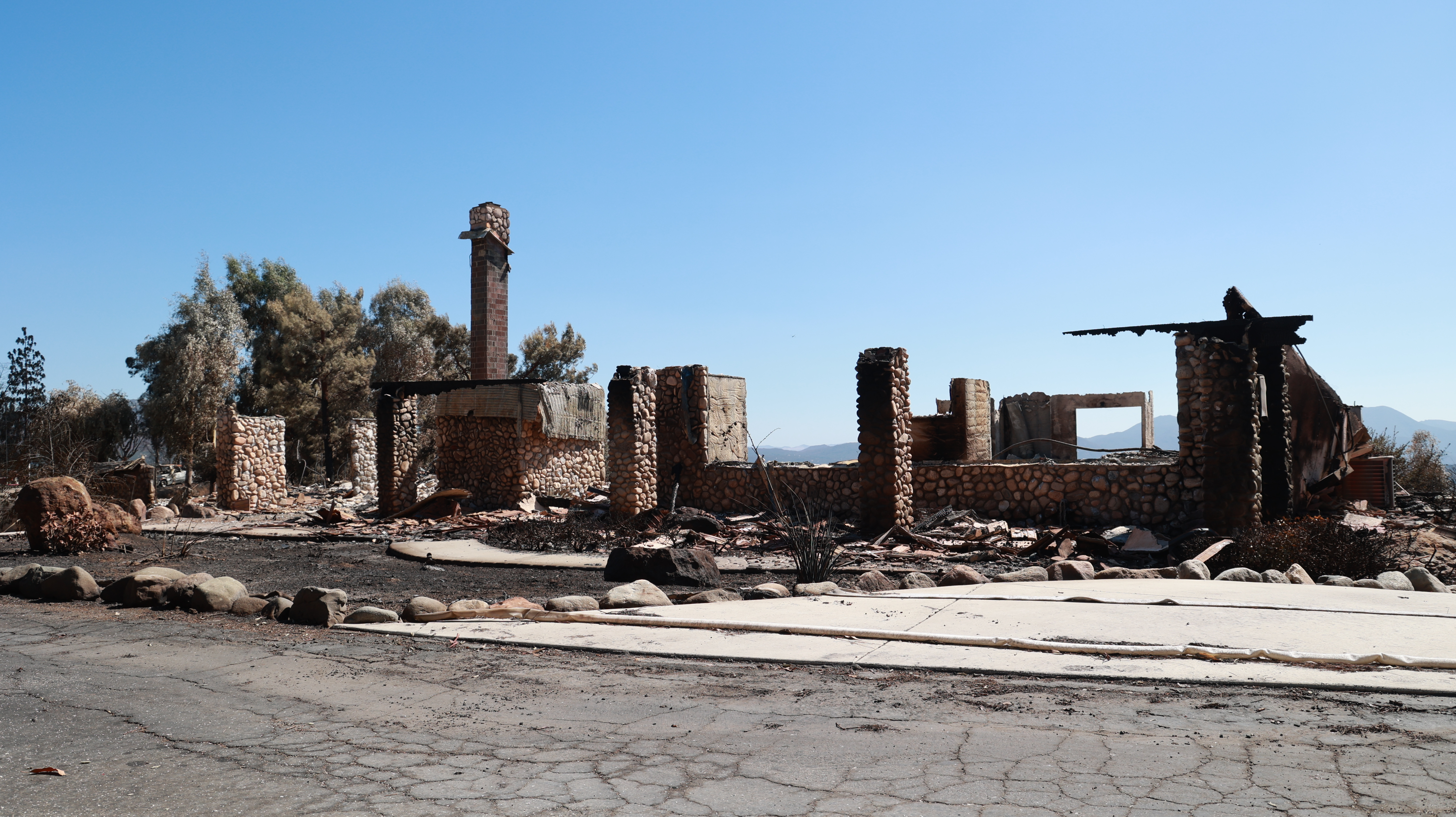
- A structure that was destroyed by the fire seen on the afternoon of September 14, 2024.
- Date: September 9 –; October 5, 2024; (27 days)
- Location: Orange County & Riverside County, Southern California, United States
- Coordinates: 33.667°N 117.566°W

Statistics
- Burned area: 23,526 acres (9,521 ha; 37 sq mi; 95 km^{2})

Impacts
- Injuries: 19 firefighters, 2 civilians
- Structures destroyed: 160 (34 damaged)

Ignition
- Cause: Equipment use

Map
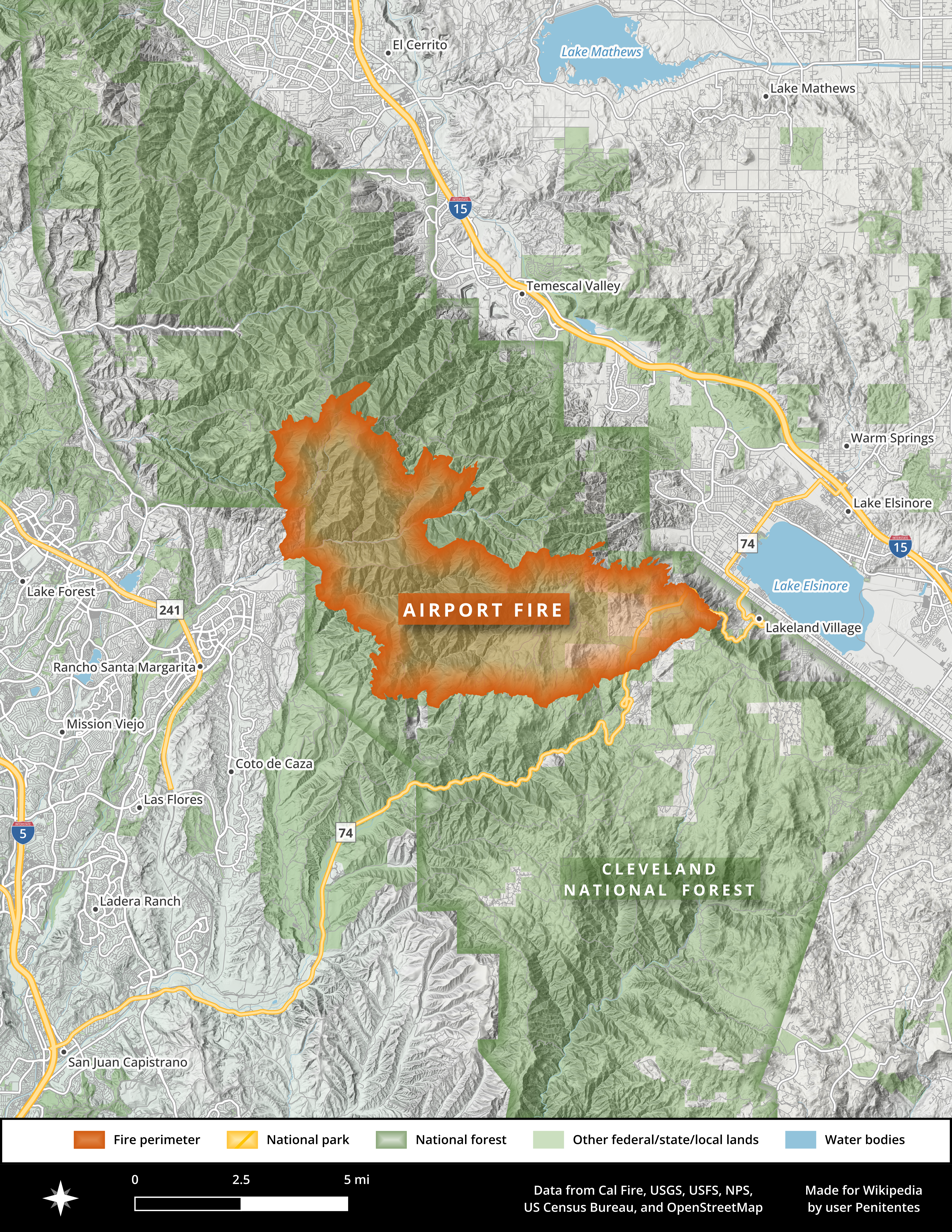
- The area burned in the Airport Fire

- General location of the fire in Greater Los Angeles The general location of the fire in California

The Airport Fire was a wildfire that burned 24,000 acres (9,700 ha) in the Santa Ana Mountains in Southern California in September and October 2024. The fire destroyed 160 structures in Orange and Riverside counties and caused 21 non-fatal injuries. At its peak, 20,780 structures were threatened by the fire.

The fire was accidentally ignited on September 9, 2024, by Orange County Public Works employees conducting fire prevention measures in the unincorporated community of Trabuco Canyon. It spread towards the city of Rancho Santa Margarita and eastward into the Santa Ana Mountains, where it crossed over the ridge of Santiago Peak into Riverside County.

The Airport Fire forced mandatory evacuation orders in various Southern California communities, particularly in Lake Elsinore and along Ortega Highway where many structures were damaged or destroyed. The incident happened concurrently with the Line Fire in San Bernardino County and the Bridge Fire in Los Angeles County, straining available firefighting resources and creating a smoky, unhealthy air quality that reached as far as Las Vegas. California governor Gavin Newsom declared a state of emergency in response to the fires.

== Cause ==
On September 9, 2024, an Orange County Public Works crew accidentally ignited a brush fire using heavy equipment in Trabuco Canyon. Two employees were placing large boulders as barriers on Trabuco Creek Road to prevent the public — primarily motorcyclists — from accessing a dry brush area of the canyon with a high fire risk. The employees noticed smoke coming from their vehicle's loader basket, called 911, and unsuccessfully attempted to put out the fire using extinguishers. The Orange County Fire Authority officially classified the fire's cause as "unintentional".

== Progression ==
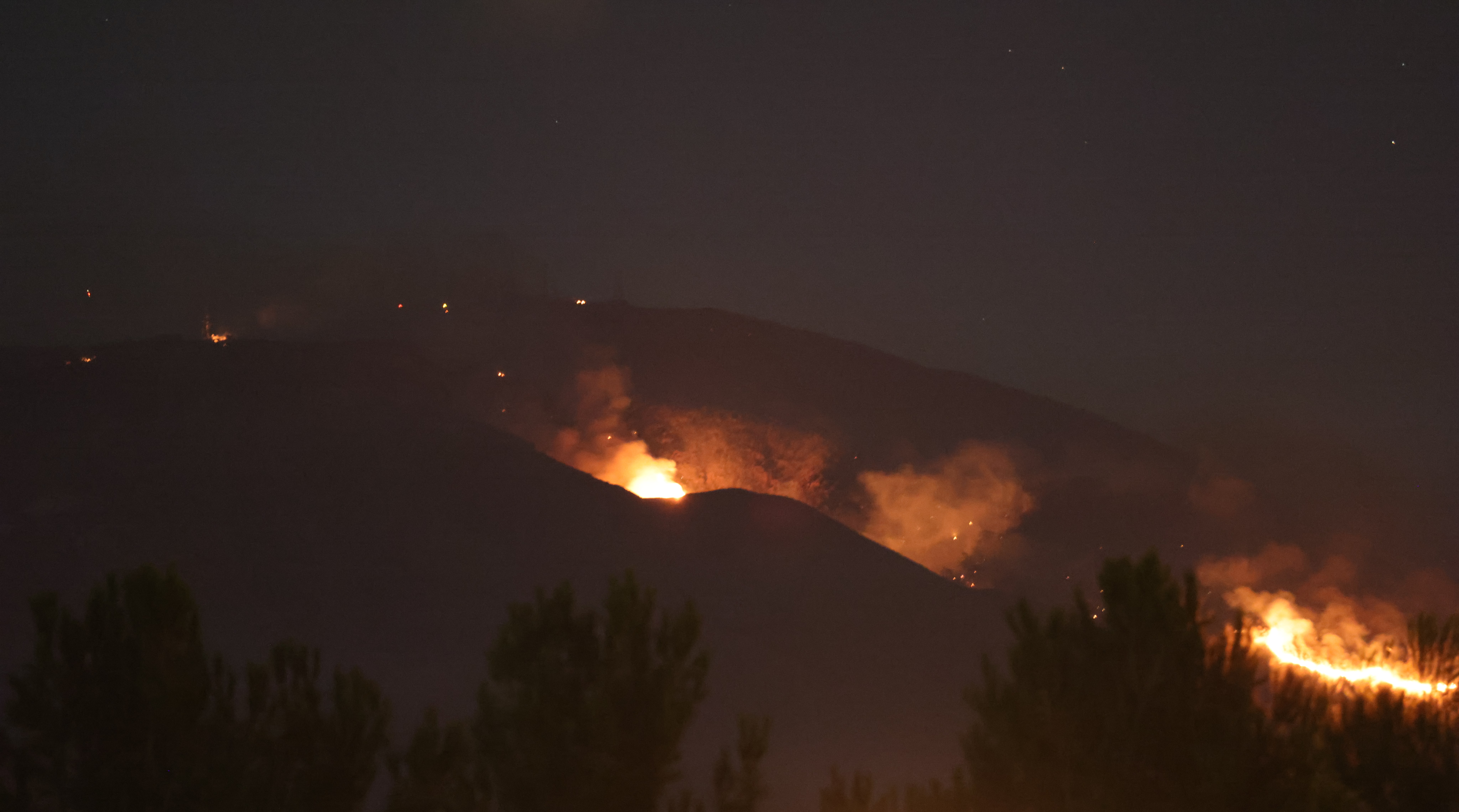
The fire as seen from Stonegate Elementary School in Irvine

The fire began around 1:00 p.m. on September 9 in the Trabuco Canyon near the Trabuco Flyers Club, a radio-remote controlled aviation club that the fire was named for.

The fire was two miles (3.2 km) from the Forest Service's Trabuco fire station, which was not staffed by Forest Service firefighters or fire engines. The station was instead staffed by a fire engine belonging to the Orange County Fire Authority (OCFA). When the OCFA's Engine 18 arrived at the scene of the Airport Fire, it had burned one-half acre (0.20 ha) "in medium brush with a moderate rate of spread", according to Los Angeles Times reporting on OCFA radio communications. The engine crew, who were also forced to treat two people at the scene for smoke inhalation, were unable to keep the fire from spreading upslope.

By 10:00 p.m., the fire had burned approximately 5,432 acres (2,198 ha).

As of October 6, 2024, at 8:03 AM, the Airport Fire in Trabuco Canyon had burned 23,526 acres and was 100% contained. The fire threatened 20,780 structures, destroyed 160, and damaged 34. There were 2 civilian injuries and 20 firefighter injuries reported, with no fatalities.

== Effects ==
=== Evacuations ===
On September 9, the first day of the fire, the Orange County Sheriff's Department enforced mandatory evacuation orders in the Robinson Ranch and Trabuco Highlands neighborhoods of Rancho Santa Margarita, the closest city to the fire's origin point. The authority also issued voluntary evacuation warnings for several Trabuco Canyon neighborhoods north of the origin point. On September 10, the blaze grew from 1,900 acres to 19,028 acres and spread into Riverside County, threatening over 10,000 structures in both counties and prompting new evacuation orders for 45 rural zones in the eastern Santa Ana foothills near Lake Elsinore and Temescal Valley. On September 12, authorities lifted the mandatory evacuations in Rancho Santa Margarita and allowed residents to return home; new orders were put in place along the Orange County portion of Ortega Highway the same day. On September 13, Cal Fire Riverside reduced the county's mandatory evacuation area to 14 zones.

=== Air quality ===
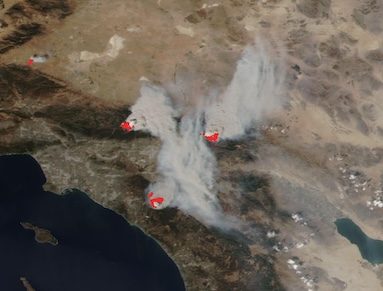
A NASA image of smoke from California wildfires on September 10, including the Bridge Fire (left), Line Fire (right), and the Airport Fire (bottom)

The Airport Fire produced a large pyrocumulus cloud, worsening the air quality in the immediate area and nearby population centers in Orange and Riverside counties. During the fire, the South Coast Air Quality Management District issued a smoke advisory in Southern California and rated the air quality as "hazardous", the worst possible rating on its scale.

The Airport Fire burned concurrently with the Line Fire in San Bernardino County and the Bridge Fire in Los Angeles County, creating a combined cloud over the Greater Los Angeles and Inland Empire regions of Southern California. A thick heavy smoke affected the Victorville, Big Bear, and Apple Valley had a dark orange sky looked like Mars then 5:15 pm the fire front, with red-orange thick smoke plume that day turned into night at High Desert. Winds blowing east carried the smoke as far as Las Vegas, creating a thick enough haze to delay flights at Harry Reid International Airport.

=== Property damage ===
Damage assessment teams were limited in the initial days of the fire as conditions remained too dangerous to provide access to areas inside the burn zone. On September 13, fire authorities acknowledged several instances of structure damage and loss throughout the fire's path and reported that teams were working on compiling a full report. Cal Fire reported 160 structures destroyed and an additional 34 damaged.

=== Injuries ===
Cal Fire reported two civilian and 19 firefighter injuries, most from heat-related causes. No deaths were reported.

On the evening of September 19, eight firefighters from OCFA's Santiago Handcrew were injured in a rollover crash on State Route 241 in Irvine while returning from a 12-hour shift working on the Airport Fire. The crew carrier truck's driver swerved to avoid a ladder in the road, causing the vehicle to hit a guard rail and flip over. An initial press report noted that two of the crew members were treated for minor injuries and released while six others received serious injuries with conditions ranging from "stable to critical". Two more of the firefighters were released the following evening.

=== Political response ===
Five congressional representatives wrote to the Cleveland National Forest leadership, questioning their choices in handling understaffing, and specifically highlighting how the issue contributed, in their view, to the severity and spread of the Airport Fire.

== Growth and containment table ==
Fire containment status Gray: contained; Red: active; %: percent contained;
Date	Area burned	Personnel	Containment
Sep 9	1,900 acres (7.7 km^{2})	-	
Sep 10	19,028 acres (77.00 km^{2})	629	
Sep 11	22,376 acres (90.55 km^{2})	629	
Sep 12	23,410 acres (94.7 km^{2})	771	
Sep 13	23,410 acres (94.7 km^{2})	771	
Sep 14	23,519 acres (95.18 km^{2})	1,949	
Sep 15	23,519 acres (95.18 km^{2})	2,201	
Sep 16	23,519 acres (95.18 km^{2})	2,037	
Sep 17	23,519 acres (95.18 km^{2})	1,988	
Sep 18	23,519 acres (95.18 km^{2})	2,052	
Sep 19	23,519 acres (95.18 km^{2})	2,007	
Sep 20	23,519 acres (95.18 km^{2})	2,007	
Sep 21	No update provided		
Sep 22	23,519 acres (95.18 km^{2})	1,189	
Oct 06	23,526 acres (95.2 km²)		

== See also ==
- Glossary of wildfire terms
- List of California wildfires
- 2024 California wildfires
