= Big Horn Mine =

Defunct gold mine in Sheridan County, Wyoming

Coordinates: 34.3567°N 117.7444°W

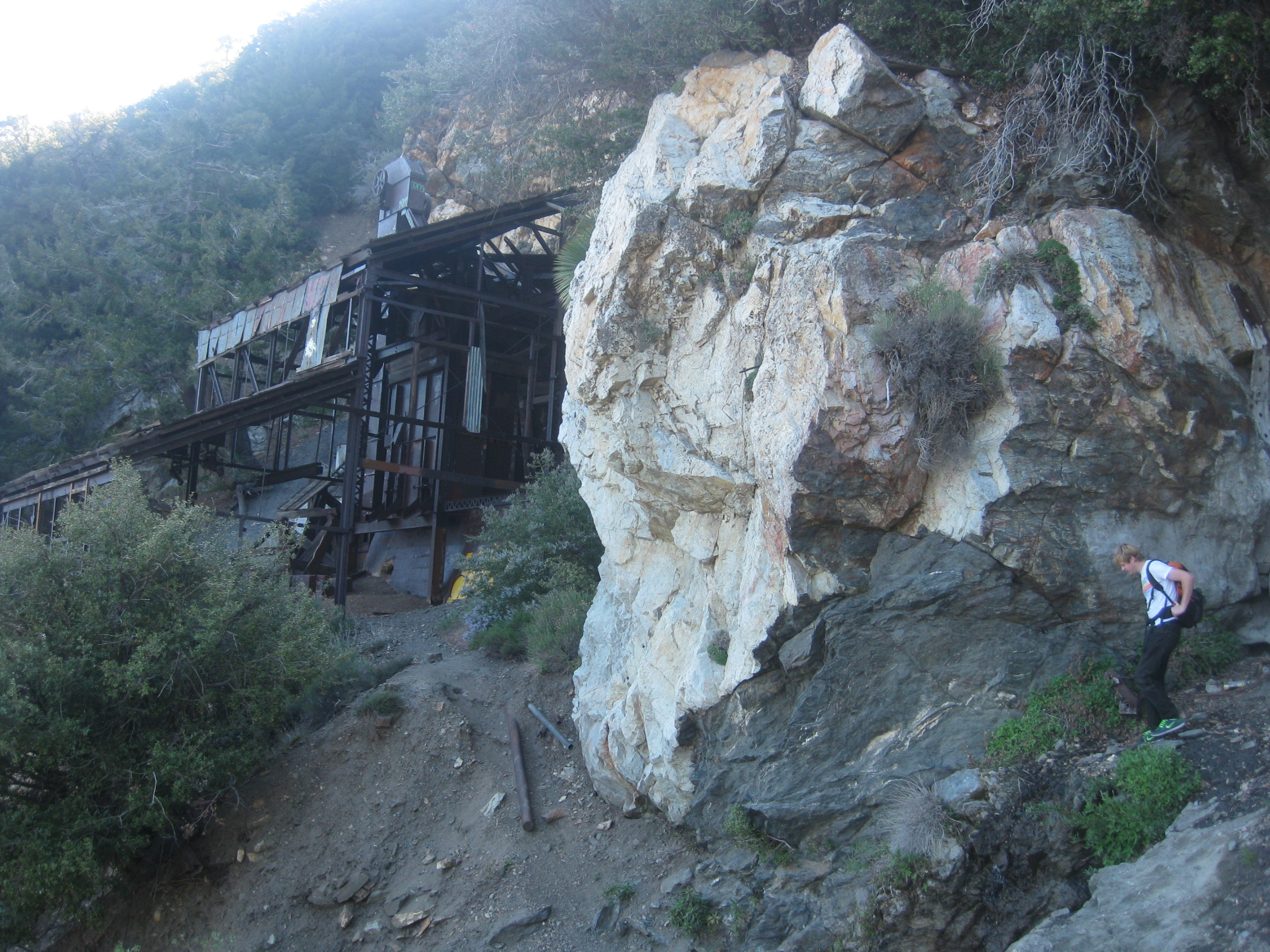
A hiker approaches the ruins of Big Horn Mine.

The Big Horn Mine is a defunct gold mine located at the headwaters of the east fork of the San Gabriel River off Highway 2 at Vincent's Gap in the Angeles National Forest in Southern California, U.S. It was once touted as the “granddaddy” of the San Gabriel Canyon mines.

== History ==
Civil War veteran named Charles Tom Vincent, born Charles Vincent Dougherty, discovered Big Horn Mine in 1888. Tall tales surrounded Vincent's origins, including that he confessed on his deathbed to having killed three men in Arizona who he and a mining partner had caught ransacking their home.

The mine first opened in 1895 and remained in use until 1985. F.V. Layton served as general manager of the Big Horn Mining Company. The mine was developed to 300 feet in length and was crosscut to a depth of 1200 feet in length. It was discovered that the solid gold ore inside was 50 feet in width, weighing in at two million tons and worth $8 million. The mill and machinery used to extract the gold was initially run by waterpower, per an 1895 report. Despite its net worth, the mine yielded only $200,000 in gold under the Lowell and California Company from 1902 to 1910. In 1985, it was determined that the cost of gold was not worth the extensive exploration and drilling, and the mine was finally abandoned.

It was reported by the Los Angeles Times in 2025 that the mine had burned down in the Bridge Fire.

== Gallery ==
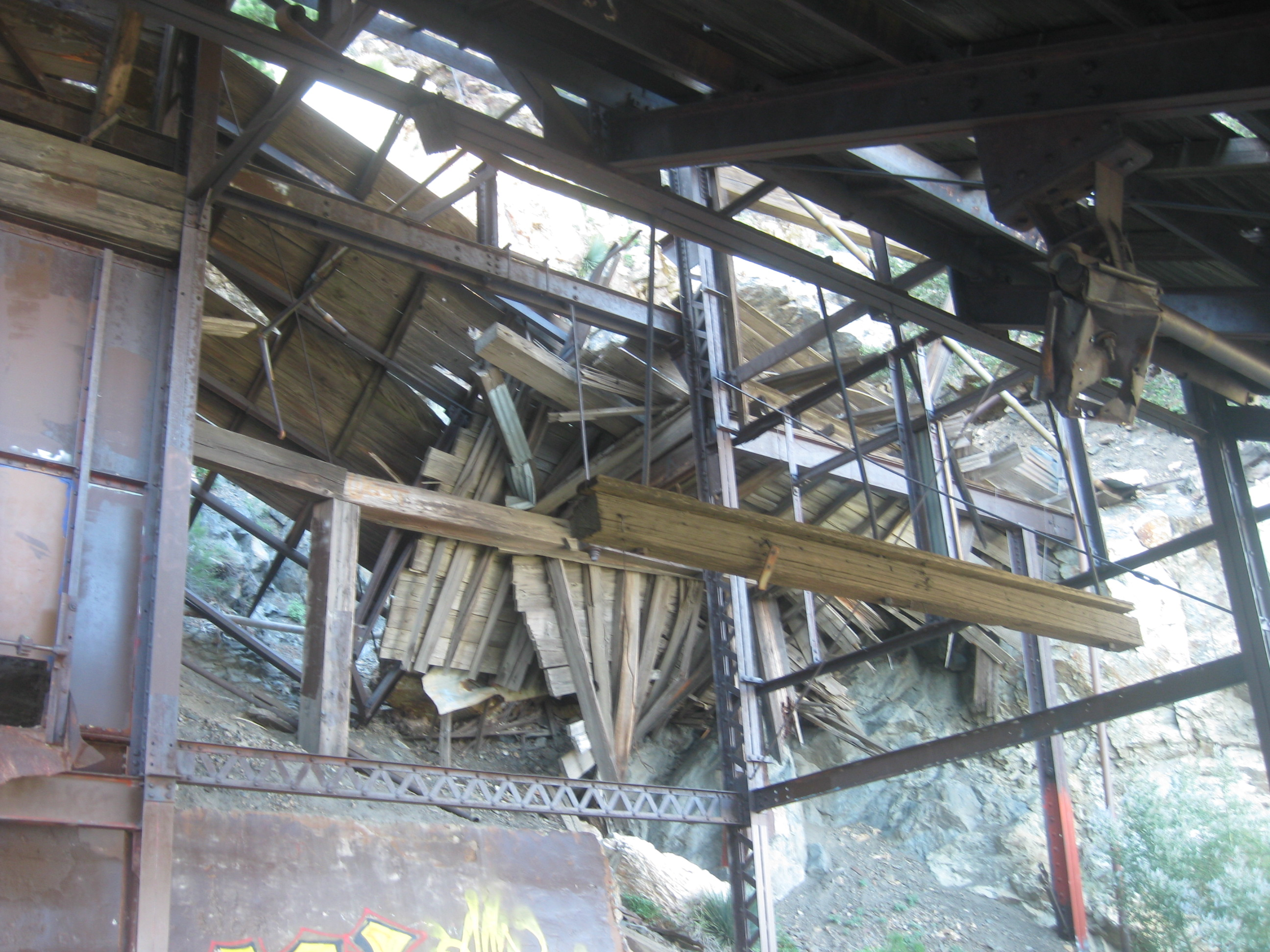
Ruins of the mine

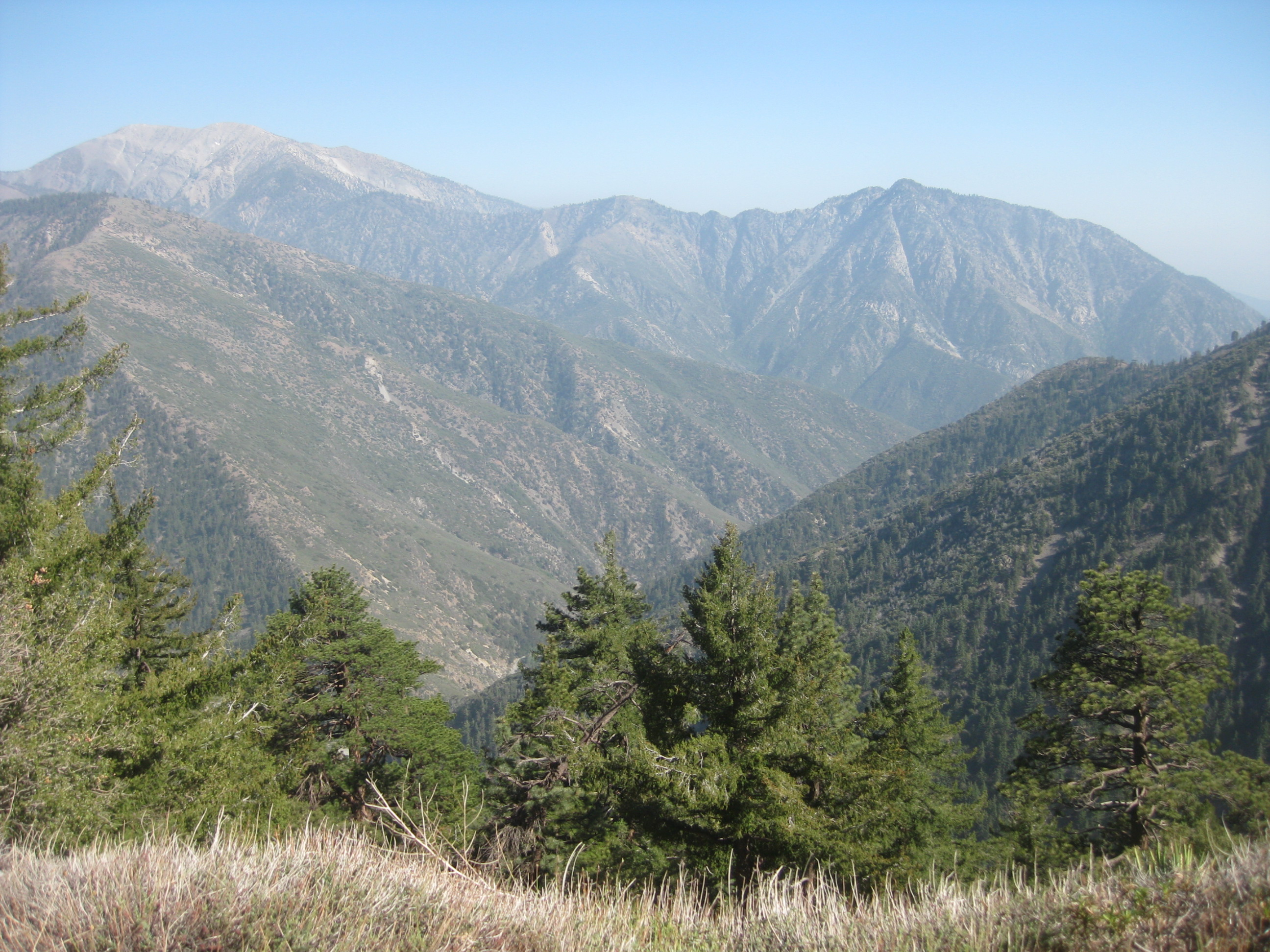
A view of the Angeles National Forest from the mine.

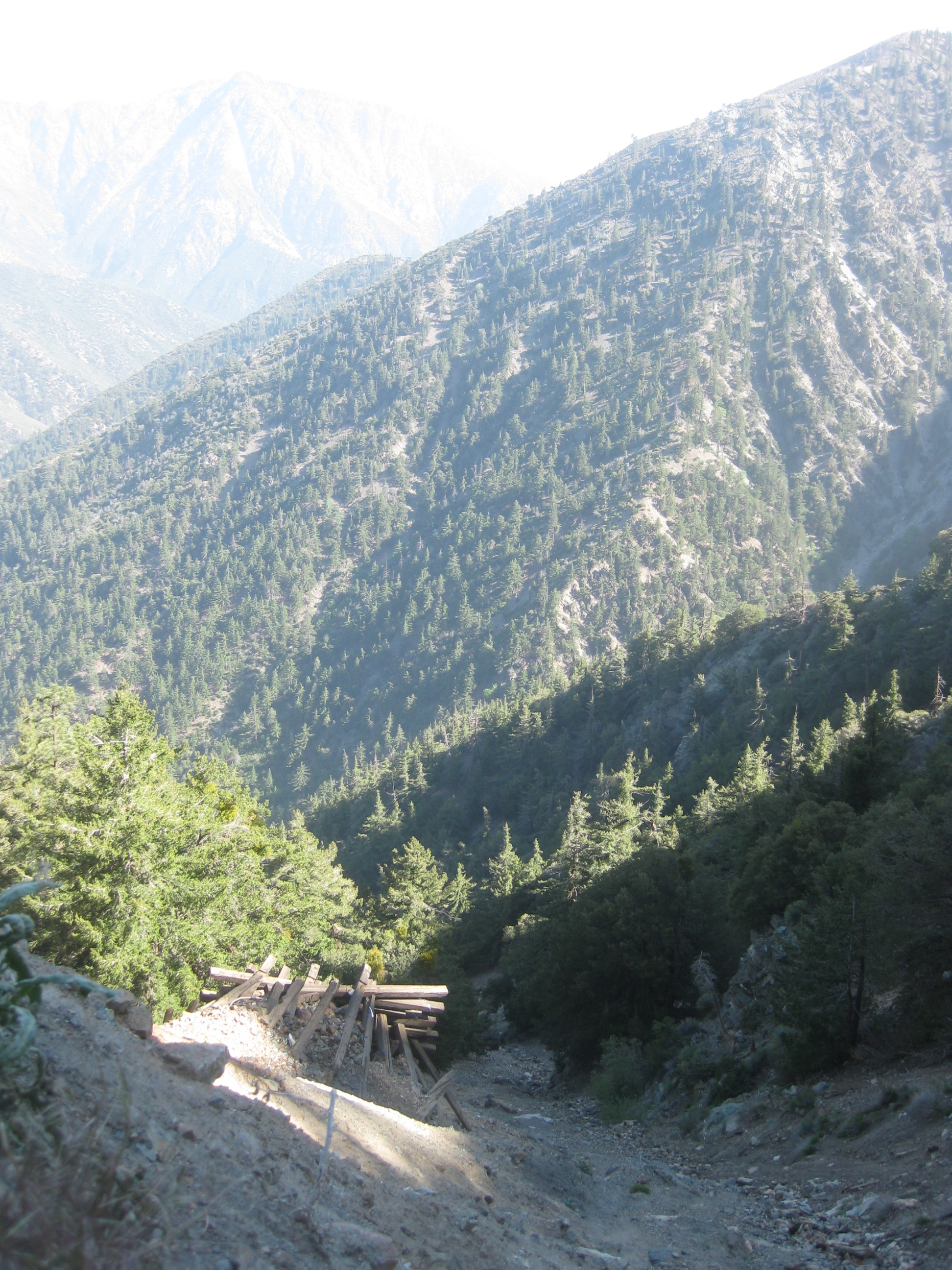
A view of the Angeles National Forest from the mine.

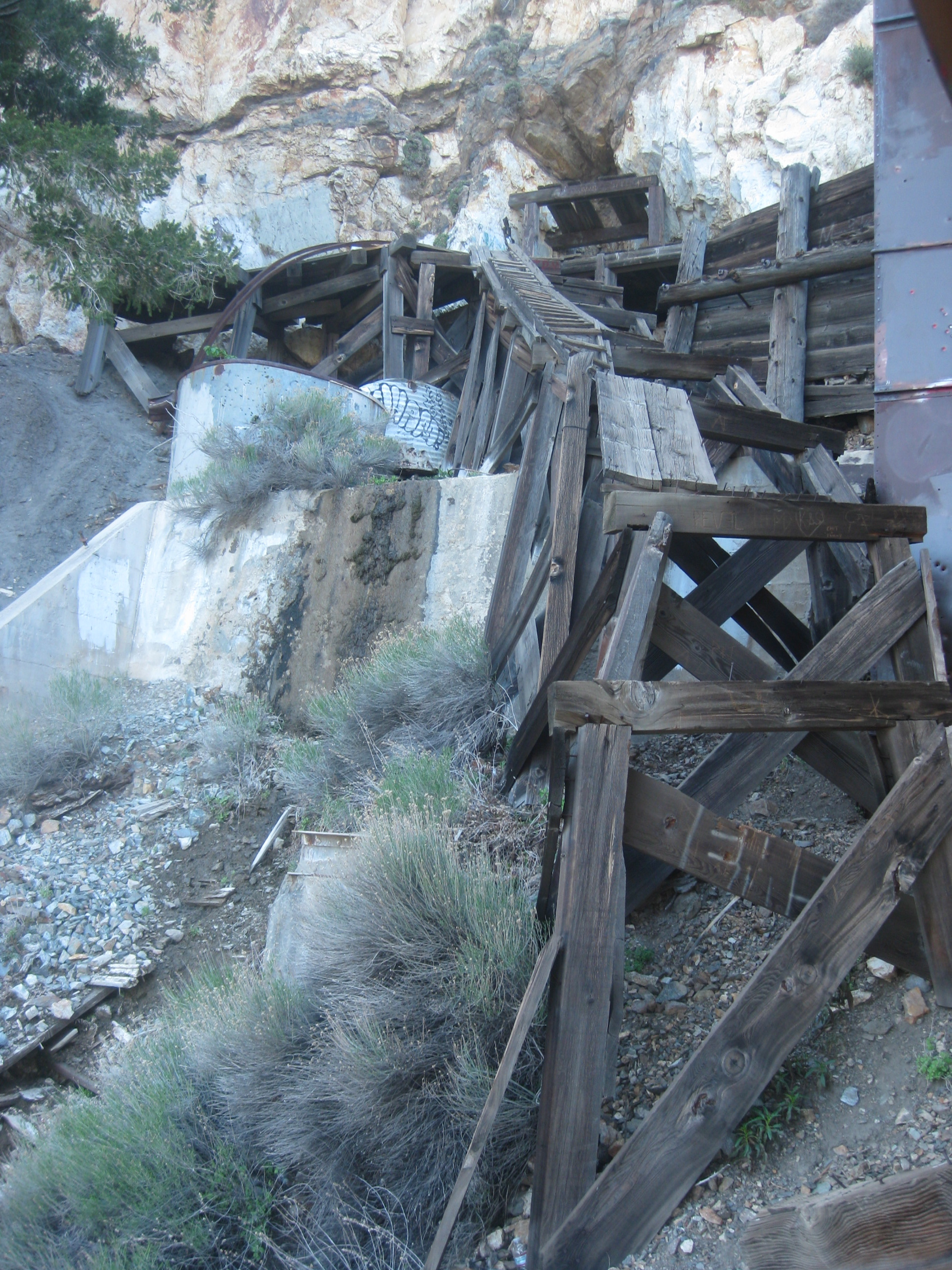
Another view of the ruins.

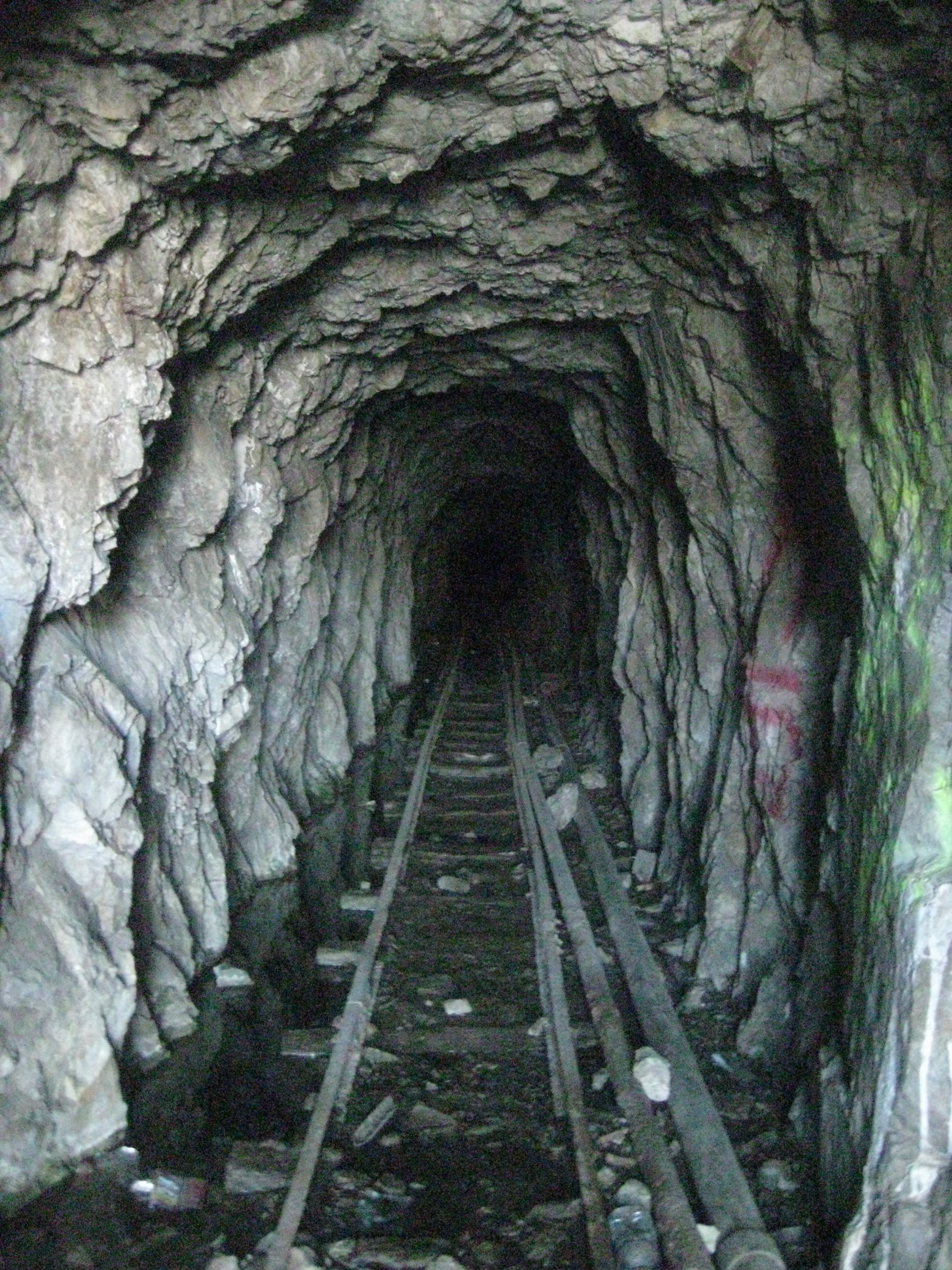
A view inside the mine tunnel.

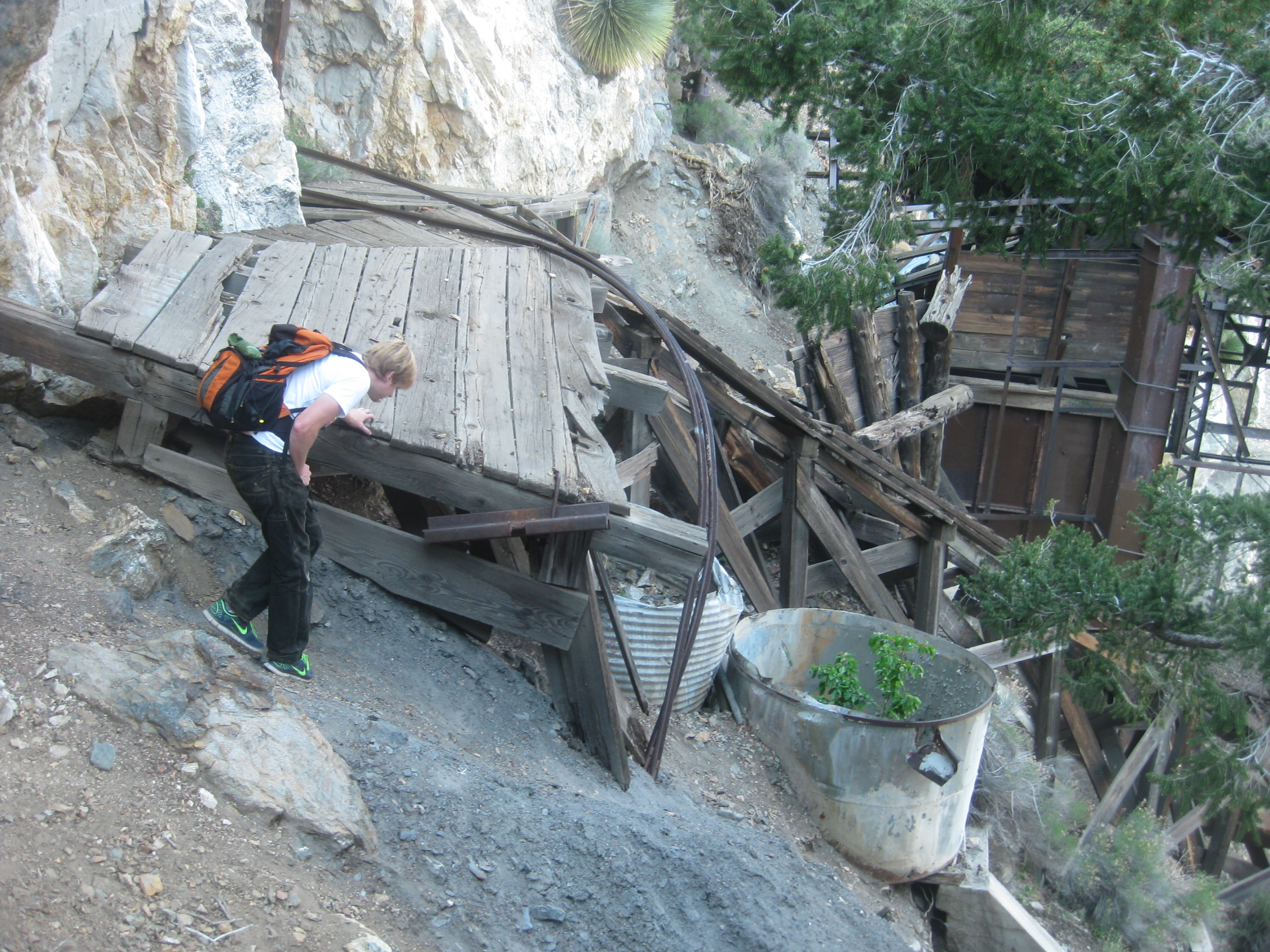
A hiker explores the mine ruins.

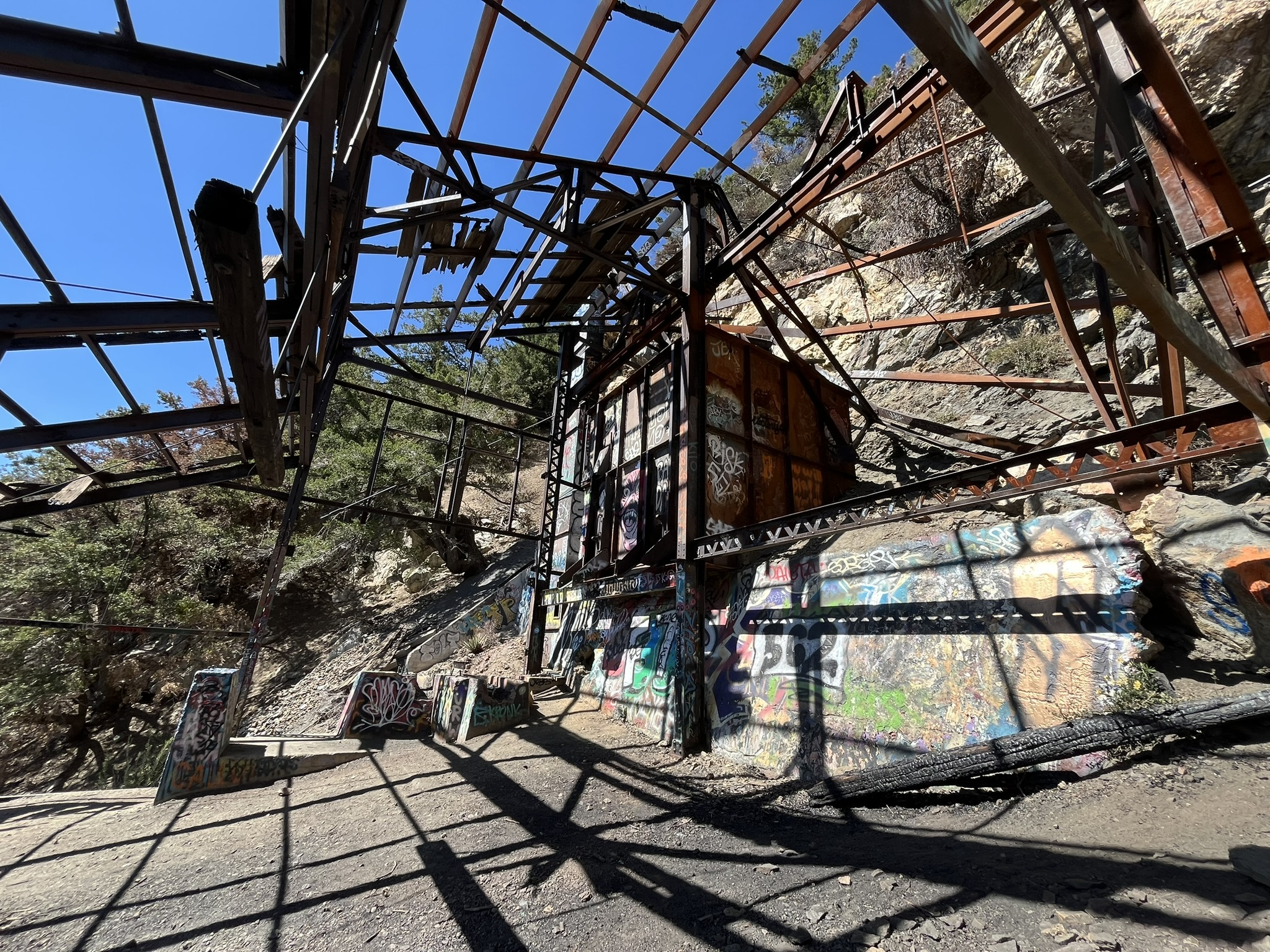
Interior view after 2024 Fire

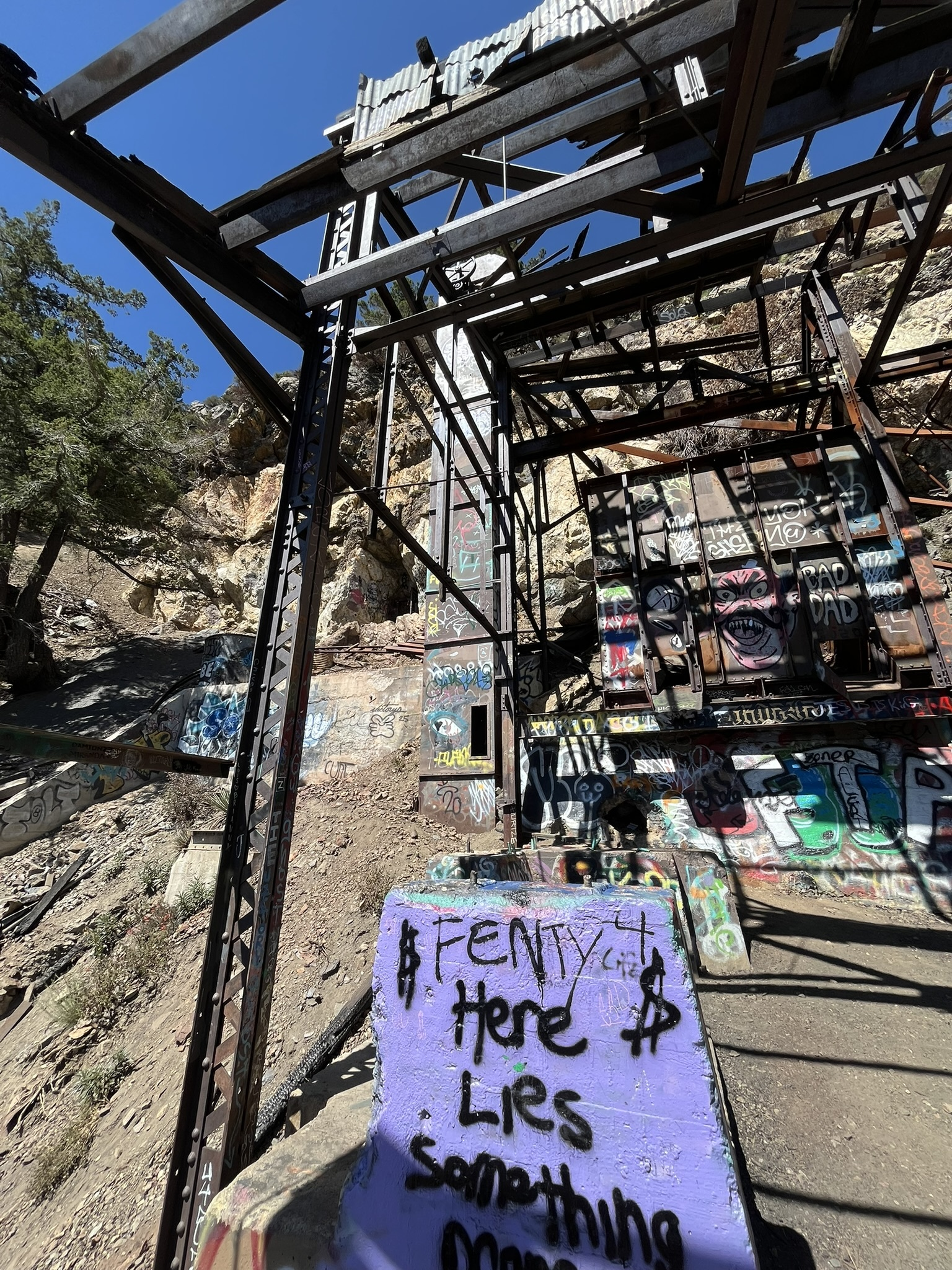
Entrance after 2024 Fire

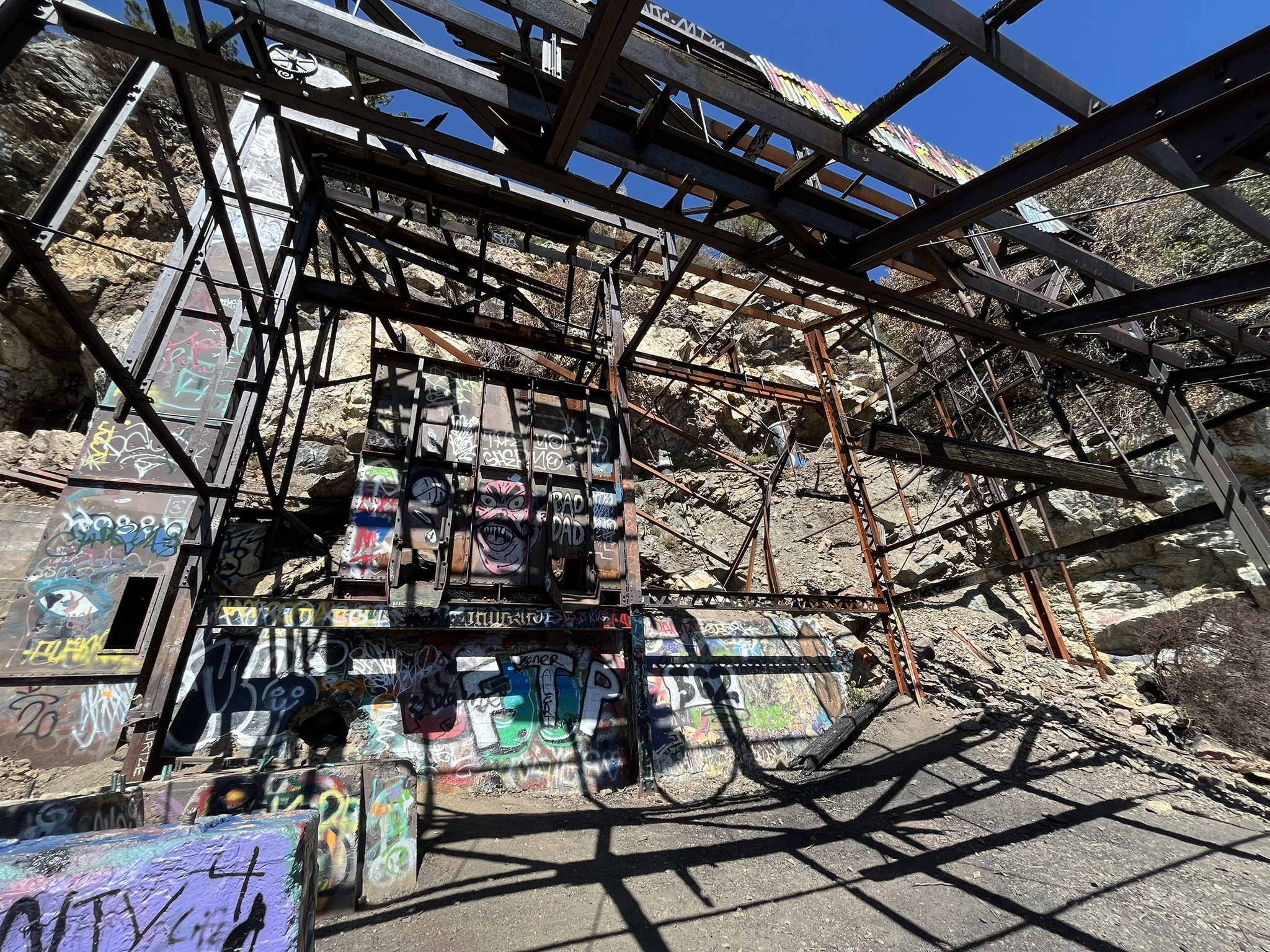
Roof after 2024 Fire
