= Bridge Fire =

2024 wildfire in Southern California

- Part of the 2024 California wildfires
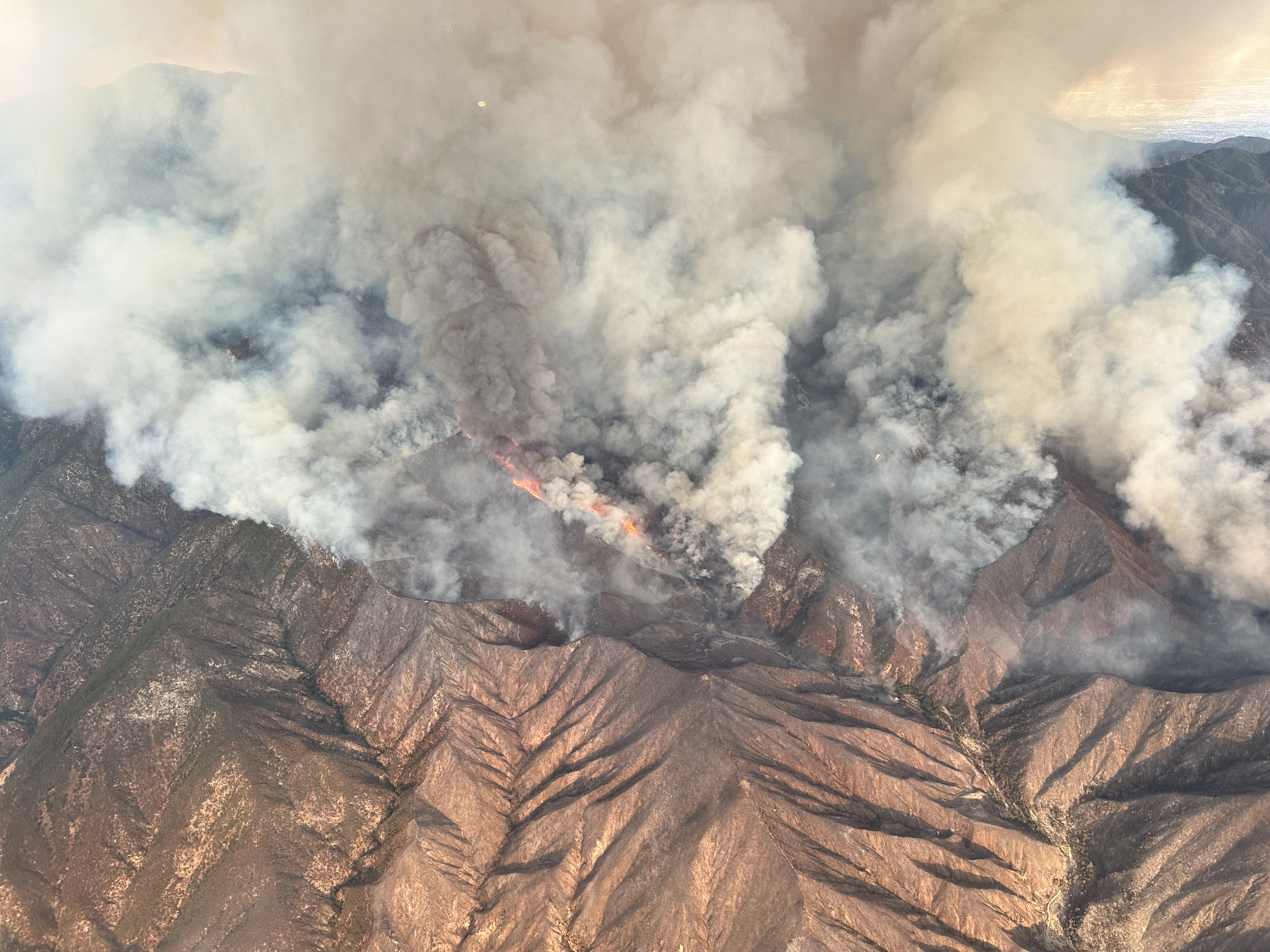
- The Bridge Fire seen from the air on September 9
- Date: September 8, 2024 –; November 26, 2024; (79 days)
- Location: Los Angeles and San Bernardino counties, Southern California, United States
- Coordinates: 34.239°N 117.762°W

Statistics
- Perimeter: 100% contained
- Burned area: 56,030 acres (22,675 ha; 88 sq mi; 227 km^{2})

Impacts
- Deaths: 0
- Injuries: 8
- Structures destroyed: 81 (17 damaged)

Ignition
- Cause: Under Investigation

Map
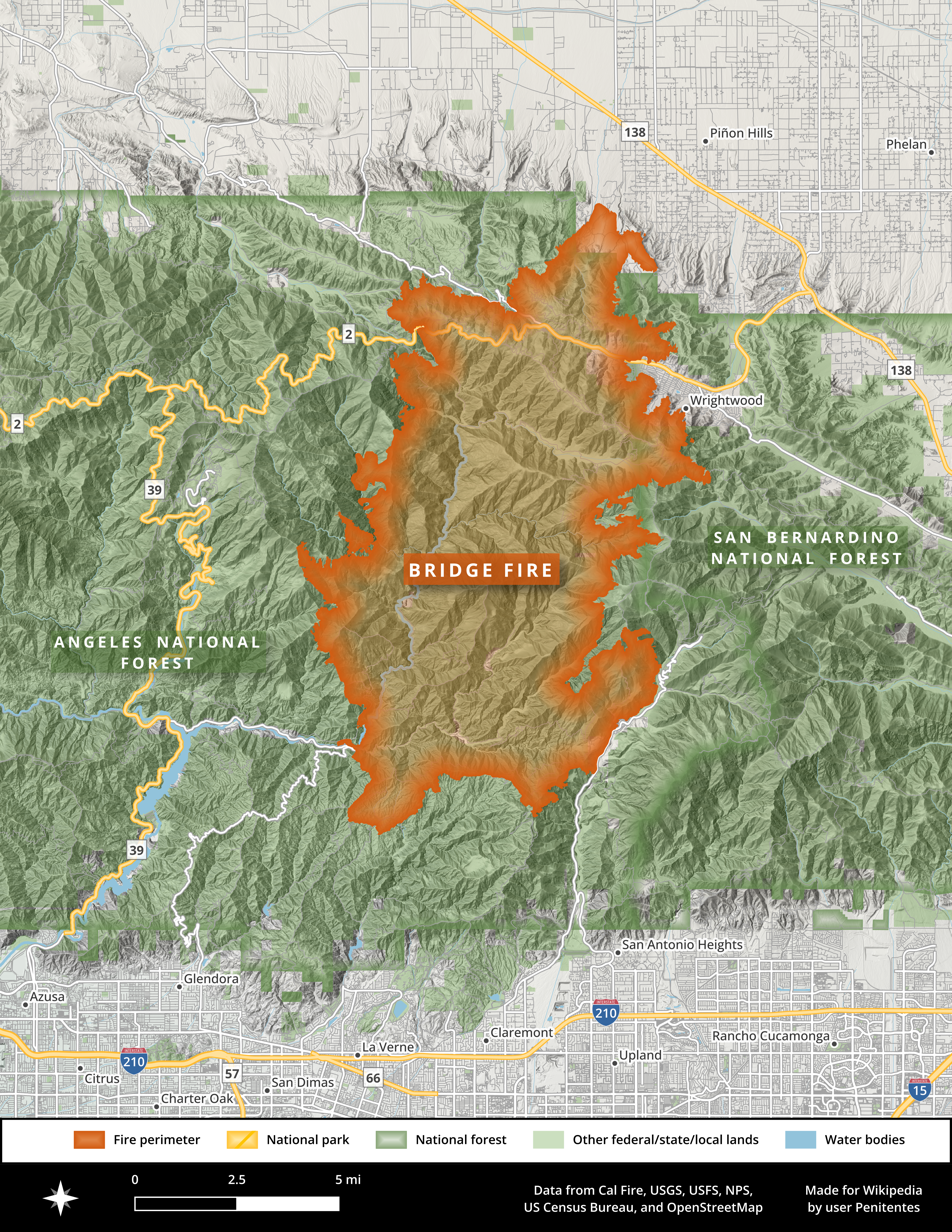
- The area burned in the Bridge Fire

- The general location of the fire in Greater Los Angeles General location of the fire in California

The Bridge Fire was a damaging wildfire in the Angeles National Forest in Southern California's Los Angeles and San Bernardino counties. The fire began on September 8 and burned a total of 56,030 acres (22,670 hectares) before being fully contained on November 26, 2024. The cause of the fire is under investigation. It was the third-largest wildfire of California's 2024 fire season. The fire threatened the areas of Wrightwood, Mount Baldy Village and Jackson Lake, where mandatory evacuation orders were in place. The fire affected nearly 100 structures total.

== Background ==
The Bridge Fire burned in an area with little to no recent fire history. Two prior wet winters contributed to the growth of vegetation in the fire area. Weather conditions, including gusty southwest winds and low relative humidity, led to a Red Flag Warning to be issued and allowed for rapid fire growth.

The Bridge Fire burned simultaneously with the 43,978-acre (17,797 ha) Line Fire in San Bernardino County and the 23,526-acre (9,521 ha) Airport Fire in Orange and Riverside Counties. The three concurrent wildfires strained the capacities of Southern California fire agencies, leading them to request additional resources from Northern California and other states.

== Progression ==
The Bridge Fire began at 2:12 p.m. PDT on Sunday, September 8, 2024. The cause of the fire is Under Investigation. It ignited near Cattle Canyon Bridge, for which it was named, in the vicinity of East Fork Road and Glendora Mountain Road in San Gabriel Canyon.

The fire spread to 800 acres (320 ha) by early Sunday evening. At 7:15 p.m., an evacuation order was issued for two populated areas in the East Fork San Gabriel River canyon, Camp Williams and River Community.

By Monday, September 9, the fire had burned 1,255 acres (508 ha). At 5:30 p.m., mandatory evacuation orders were issued for Mount Baldy Village, extending between the San Antonio Dam and Mount Baldy Resort. By that night the fire had burned 2,995 acres (1,212 ha). Firefighters were concentrated on halting the southward progression of the fire and protecting homes in the East Fork San Gabriel River area.

On Tuesday, September 10, the fire "exploded" to the north and northeast and grew considerably, from about 4,000 acres (1,600 ha) to more than 34,000 acres (14,000 ha) within hours. It continued to grow overnight, burning an additional 13,000 acres (5,300 ha) on its northern and eastern flanks as firefighters prioritized protecting buildings in Wrightwood, Piñon Hills, and Mount Baldy Village. Thousands of people fled those communities, and some reported receiving no evacuation warning before being forced to leave immediately. The chief executive officer of San Bernardino County issued a proclamation of a local emergency in the county.

On Wednesday, September 11, 480 firefighting personnel were assigned to the Bridge Fire and California governor Gavin Newsom issued a proclamation of a state of emergency in Los Angeles and San Bernardino counties.

By September 12, the fire had burned 51,792 acres (20,959 ha) and was zero percent contained.

Three percent of the fire perimeter was reported as contained on September 14.

On September 15, 2,600 emergency personnel were fighting the fire and had increased containment to nine percent. Cal Fire said that the crews had contained the spread of the fire overnight to be "minimal" at 800 acres. Helicopters were unable to fly the prior night due to the smoke hampering visibility.

By September 19, the fire burned 54,795 acres (22,175 ha). Containment reached 49 percent with progress continuing as two evacuation orders have been downgraded to warnings and one evacuation warning was lifted.

By Thursday, September 26, the fire had burned 54,878 acres (22,208 ha) acres and was 97 percent contained.

In October, containment of the fire reached 99 percent. Fire activity was low, except for a small flare up near the Iron Fork Canyon area near the fire's western flank. The fire burned a total of 55,126 acres (22,309 ha) by October 21.

By November 26, the Bridge Fire reached 100 percent containment, after burning a total of 56,030 acres (22,670 ha).

== Effects ==
Eight firefighters were injured in the course of the fire; according to the Forest Service, none of the injuries were major.

=== Evacuations and closures ===
The fire prompted evacuation orders for the communities of Camp Williams, River Community, Wrightwood, and Mount Baldy.

=== Damage ===
The Bridge Fire destroyed at least 81 buildings and damaged 19 more: 20 homes were lost in Mount Baldy Village, 13 homes were lost in Wrightwood, and six cabins burned in the mountain wilderness. The fire also burned the visitor center building at Grassy Hollow. Ski lifts were destroyed at the Mountain High ski resort, but staff there used snowmaking machines to wet nearby vegetation and the resort itself "[appeared] to be mostly unharmed by fire", according to CBS News. Two shacks and equipment belonging to the resort's ski patrol team were destroyed.

The Bridge Fire burned multiple popular hiking trails in the San Gabriel Mountains. Twelve miles (19 km) of the Pacific Crest Trail between Vincent Gap and Wright Mountain burned (Including the Big Horn Mine and Stamp Mill), as did portions of the Bridge to Nowhere trail, the Old Mount Baldy Trail, the Bear Canyon Trail, and others.

=== Political response ===
The state of California requested a Fire Management Assistance Grant—which allows the federal government to cover a certain percentage of eligible firefighting costs—from the Federal Emergency Management Agency (FEMA) on September 10. FEMA granted the request at 9:18 p.m. Los Angeles County supervisor Lindsey Horvath signed a declaration of a local emergency.

On October 7, the Los Angeles County Board of Supervisors unanimously passed a motion establishing multiple task forces for Economic Recovery, Watershed Hazard Assessment, Health and Social Services, Debris Removal and Rebuild, and Natural and Cultural Resources.

== Growth and containment table ==
Fire containment status Gray: contained; Red: active; %: percent contained
Date	Total area burned	Personnel	Containment
Sep 8	800 acres (3 km^{2})	...	
Sep 9	2,995 acres (12 km^{2})	250	
Sep 10	34,240 acres (139 km^{2})	471	
Sep 11	49,008 acres (198 km^{2})	471	
Sep 12	51,167 acres (207 km^{2})	408	
Sep 13	52,960 acres (214 km^{2})	408	
Sep 14	53,783 acres (218 km^{2})	2,625	
Sep 15	54,567 acres (221 km^{2})	2,625	
Sep 16	54,774 acres (222 km^{2})	2,707	
Sep 17	54,795 acres (222 km^{2})	2,727	
Sep 18	54,795 acres (222 km^{2})	2,549	
Sep 19	54,795 acres (222 km^{2})	1,850	
Sep 20	54,795 acres (222 km^{2})	1,910	
Sep 21	54,795 acres (222 km^{2})	1,910	
Sep 24	54,795 acres (222 km^{2})	1,056	
Sep 27	54,878 acres (222 km^{2})	255	
Oct 21	55,126 acres (223 km^{2})	60	
Nov 26	56,030 acres (227 km^{2})	...	

== See also ==
- Glossary of wildfire terms
- List of California wildfires
- 2024 California wildfires
