= Big Piney =

Big Piney may refer to:

- Big Piney, Wyoming, a town
- Big Piney, Missouri, an unincorporated community

== See also ==
- Big Pine (disambiguation)
- Big Piney River
