= Wrightwood, California =

Unincorporated community in California, United States

- census-designated place
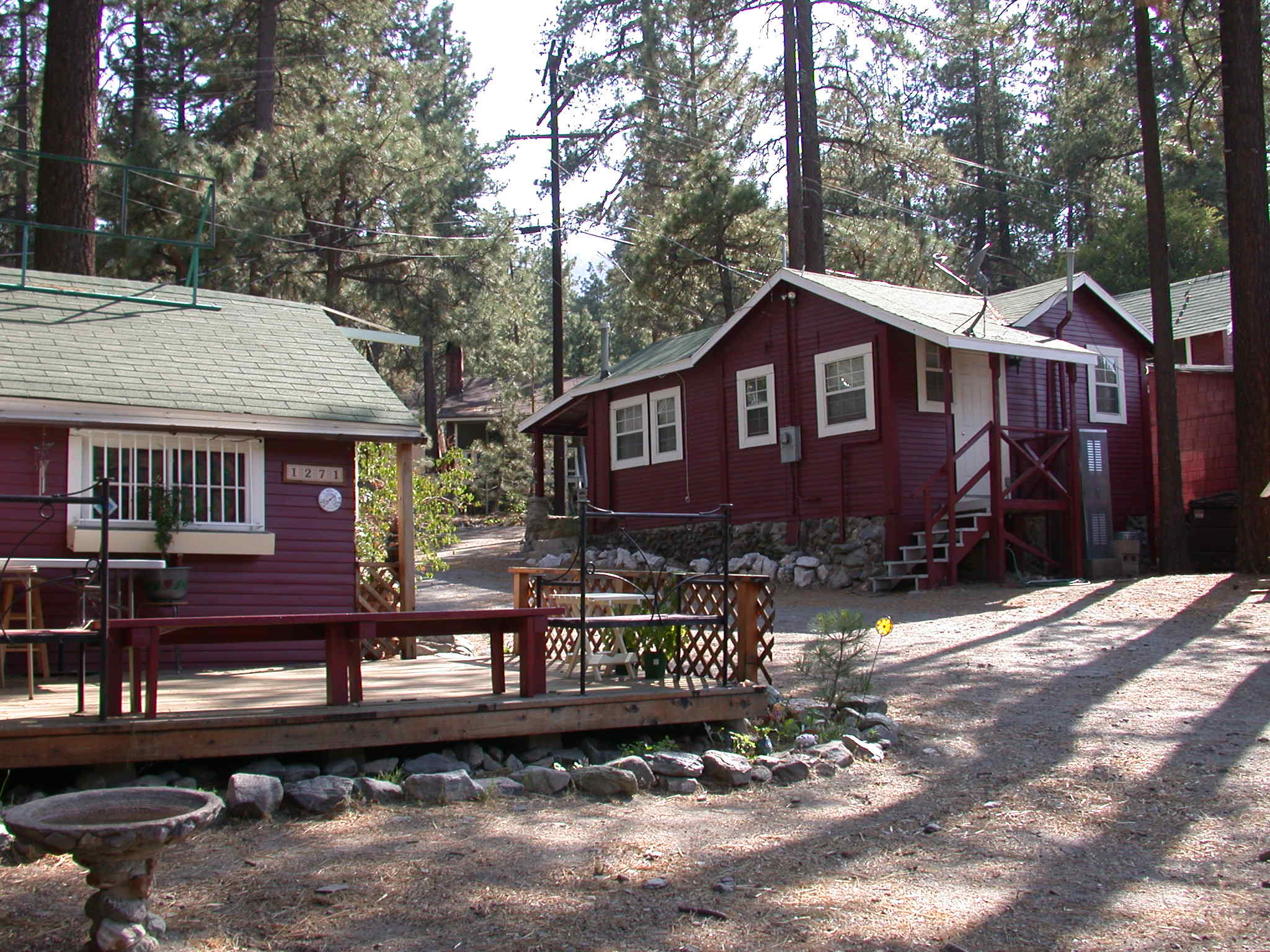
- Downtown Wrightwood is dotted with many old resort cabins from the 1930s.

- Location in San Bernardino County and the state of California

- Location in the United States
- Coordinates: 34°21′39″N 117°38′00″W
- Country: United States
- State: California
- County: San Bernardino

Area
  - Total: 5.95 sq mi (15.42 km^{2})
  - Land: 5.95 sq mi (15.41 km^{2})
  - Water: 0.0039 sq mi (0.01 km^{2}) 0.05%
- Elevation: 6,208 ft (1,892 m)

Population (2020)
  - Total: 4,720
  - Density: 793/sq mi (306.2/km^{2})
- Time zone: UTC-8 (PST)
  - Summer (DST): UTC-7 (PDT)
- ZIP code: 92397
- Area codes: 442/760
- FIPS code: 06-86594
- GNIS feature ID: 2409630

Wrightwood is a census-designated place in San Bernardino County, California. It sits at an elevation of 6,208 feet (1,892 m). The population was 4,720 at the 2020 census, up from 4,525 at the 2010 census. Wrightwood is located 77 miles (124 km) northeast of Los Angeles. It is on the Pacific Crest Trail.

== History ==
Located in a pine-covered valley in the San Gabriel Mountains, the Wrightwood area was first developed as cattle ranches in the 19th century by Nathan and Truman Swarthout. Later, the main ranch, owned by Sumner Wright, was broken up into residential and commercial lots, and by the 1920s a community had taken root. Early ski enthusiasts discovered the north-facing slopes of the San Gabriels above the Swarthout Valley. Until 1937, the ski area, originally known as Big Pines, was part of a Los Angeles County park. After World War II, Big Pines opened their 1946–47 ski season with a new chairlift and the Sepp Benedikter Ski School (according to their ad in the February 1947 issue of Western Skiing magazine). Highways were built connecting to the major routes in the Cajon Pass, making Wrightwood accessible without serious mountain driving.

In 1934, on two separate occasions a black bear was shot and killed by a Wrightwood resident. J. Dale Gentry, chairman of the California Fish and Game Commission, applied pressure to file charges against the two men. One of the men, Clyde Steele, was found not guilty at trial; the charges were dropped against the other man.

The former vacation community is now home to over 4,000 full-time residents. Serrano High School in the neighboring community of Phelan opened in 1977; it also serves Wrightwood and the neighboring community of Piñon Hills.

In August 2016, part of Wrightwood's population was evacuated as part of mandatory evacuations of over 82,000 people in San Bernardino County due to the Blue Cut Fire. In September 2020, the Bobcat Fire caused evacuation warnings for the Wrightwood area as it raged across the San Gabriel Mountains. In September 2024, the Bridge Fire caused the entire town to be evacuated.

== Geography ==
According to the United States Census Bureau, the CDP has a total area of 5.9 square miles (15 km^{2}), 99.94% of it land and 0.06% of it water. The climate is Mediterranean (Köppen: Csb) influenced by its highland position. Summers are vastly moderated by the cooling down of the air at the higher elevation compared to the hot plains to its north and the San Bernardino Valley to the south, although share the similar dry features and a lack of summer thunderstorms. In winter, the Mediterranean tendencies of the more semi-arid lowland areas are exaggerated by orographic lift, causing precipitation comparable to areas much further north in California. However, due to the elevation, a lot of winter precipitation falls as snow. Even so, daytime highs year-round average above freezing, rendering snowpacks unstable and unreliable.

Climate data for Wrightwood, California, 1991–2020 normals, extremes 1997–2012
Month	Jan	Feb	Mar	Apr	May	Jun	Jul	Aug	Sep	Oct	Nov	Dec	Year
Record high °F (°C)	67 (19)	67 (19)	74 (23)	79 (26)	87 (31)	91 (33)	101 (38)	93 (34)	87 (31)	80 (27)	72 (22)	67 (19)	101 (38)
Mean daily maximum °F (°C)	47.6 (8.7)	47.6 (8.7)	54.3 (12.4)	60.3 (15.7)	69.1 (20.6)	78.0 (25.6)	83.3 (28.5)	81.9 (27.7)	75.0 (23.9)	64.4 (18.0)	54.8 (12.7)	47.5 (8.6)	63.7 (17.6)
Daily mean °F (°C)	36.6 (2.6)	36.4 (2.4)	41.8 (5.4)	46.1 (7.8)	54.0 (12.2)	61.2 (16.2)	67.9 (19.9)	66.7 (19.3)	60.6 (15.9)	50.5 (10.3)	41.8 (5.4)	36.0 (2.2)	50.0 (10.0)
Mean daily minimum °F (°C)	25.6 (−3.6)	25.3 (−3.7)	29.3 (−1.5)	32.0 (0.0)	38.8 (3.8)	44.3 (6.8)	52.5 (11.4)	51.4 (10.8)	46.2 (7.9)	36.7 (2.6)	28.8 (−1.8)	24.6 (−4.1)	36.3 (2.4)
Record low °F (°C)	−2 (−19)	8 (−13)	7 (−14)	14 (−10)	25 (−4)	29 (−2)	36 (2)	35 (2)	29 (−2)	19 (−7)	9 (−13)	6 (−14)	−2 (−19)
Average precipitation inches (mm)	4.37 (111)	4.93 (125)	1.85 (47)	0.80 (20)	0.79 (20)	0.08 (2.0)	1.06 (27)	0.31 (7.9)	0.38 (9.7)	1.21 (31)	1.14 (29)	4.14 (105)	21.06 (534.6)
Average snowfall inches (cm)	10.5 (27)	24.8 (63)	8.3 (21)	7.2 (18)	1.6 (4.1)	0.0 (0.0)	0.0 (0.0)	0.0 (0.0)	0.0 (0.0)	0.5 (1.3)	3.6 (9.1)	5.3 (13)	61.8 (156.5)
Average precipitation days (≥ 0.01 in)	6.0	8.0	6.1	4.7	1.9	0.5	1.9	1.8	1.5	2.9	3.2	5.3	43.8
Average snowy days (≥ 0.1 in)	3.0	5.3	2.8	2.7	0.3	0.0	0.0	0.0	0.0	0.2	1.0	2.5	17.8
Source 1: NOAA
Source 2: National Weather Service

== Demographics ==
Historical population
Census	Pop.	Note	%±
1980	2,511		—
1990	3,308		31.7%
2000	3,837		16.0%
2010	4,525		17.9%
2020	4,720		4.3%
U.S. Decennial Census; 1850–1870 1880-1890; 1900 1910 1920; 1930 1940 1950; 1960 1970 1980; 1990 2000 2010

Wrightwood Lake was first listed as a census designated place in the 1980 U.S. census.

=== 2020 census ===
As of the 2020 census, Wrightwood had a population of 4,720 and a population density of 793.1 inhabitants per square mile (306.2/km^{2}). The whole population lived in households, and 81.2% of residents lived in urban areas while 18.8% lived in rural areas.

There were 1,984 households, out of which 25.8% included children under the age of 18, 51.9% were married-couple households, 6.6% were cohabiting couple households, 21.5% had a female householder with no partner present, and 20.1% had a male householder with no partner present. 27.8% of households were one person, and 13.8% were one person aged 65 or older. The average household size was 2.38. There were 1,322 families (66.6% of all households).

The age distribution was 21.6% under the age of 18, 6.5% aged 18 to 24, 22.7% aged 25 to 44, 28.8% aged 45 to 64, and 20.4% who were 65 years of age or older. The median age was 44.5 years. For every 100 females, there were 100.3 males, and for every 100 females age 18 and over there were 100.2 males age 18 and over.

There were 2,664 housing units at an average density of 447.7 units per square mile (172.9 units/km^{2}), of which 1,984 (74.5%) were occupied. Of occupied units, 78.9% were owner-occupied and 21.1% were occupied by renters. Of all housing units, 25.5% were vacant; the homeowner vacancy rate was 1.9% and the rental vacancy rate was 6.7%.

Racial composition as of the 2020 census
Race	Number	Percent
White	3,800	80.5%
Black or African American	27	0.6%
American Indian and Alaska Native	46	1.0%
Asian	95	2.0%
Native Hawaiian and Other Pacific Islander	4	0.1%
Some other race	214	4.5%
Two or more races	534	11.3%
Hispanic or Latino (of any race)	839	17.8%

=== 2023 estimates ===
In 2023, the US Census Bureau estimated that the median household income was $78,496, and the per capita income was $52,949. About 8.2% of families and 8.9% of the population were below the poverty line.

== Politics ==
In the California State Legislature, Wrightwood is in the 23rd senatorial district, represented by Republican Suzette Martinez Valladares, and in the 41st Assembly district, represented by Democrat John Harabedian.

In the United States House of Representatives, Wrightwood is in California's 28th congressional district, represented by Democrat Judy Chu.

Parks and wastewater in Wrightwood are maintained by the Wrightwood community service district since 2017.

== Education ==
Public education in Wrightwood is managed by Snowline Joint Unified School District. Students in Wrightwood attend the following schools:

TK-5 Wrightwood Elementary School

6-8 Pinon Mesa Middle School

9-12 Serrano High School

TK-12 Snowline Academy Homeschool

TK-8 The Heritage School (Parent School of Choice)

Snowline Adult School

A summertime view of the Mountain High west resort

== Mountain High Resort ==
Just west from Wrightwood sits Big Pines, which hosts the Mountain High Resort, a popular ski/snowboard resort consisting of Three Mountains.

== Notable people ==
- Earl W. Bascom (1906–1995), rodeo champion, actor, inventor, artist; was a school teacher in Wrightwood
- Frank Bogert (1910–2009), rodeo professional, actor, mayor of Palm Springs; raised in Wrightwood
- Caleb Calvert (born 1996), soccer player
- Aldous Huxley (1894–1963), author; lived in Wrightwood for several years
- Geoffrey Lewis (1935–2015), actor; spent much of his youth in Wrightwood
- Maddie Mastro (born 2000), snowboarder and Olympian
