= Mountain High =

Winter resort in California

- Location in California Mountain High (the United States)
- Location: Big Pines, Los Angeles County, California
- Nearest city: Wrightwood, California
- Coordinates: 34.37472°N 117.69323°W
- Vertical: 1,600 ft (490 m)
- Top elevation: 8,200 feet (2,500 m) (East); 8,000 feet (2,400 m) (West); 7,800 ft (2,400 m) (North)
- Base elevation: 6,600 feet (2,000 m) (East); 7,000 feet (2,100 m) (West); 7,200 ft (2,200 m) (North)
- Skiable area: 290 acres (1.2 km^{2})
- Trails: 59 total 20% easiest 42% More difficult 34% Most difficult 3% Experts only
- Longest run: 1.6 mi (2.6 km)
- Terrain parks: Yes
- Snowmaking: Yes (partial)
- Night skiing: Yes (partial)
- Website: www.mthigh.com

Mountain High resort is a winter resort in the San Gabriel Mountains in Los Angeles County, California. Mountain High is one of the most-visited resorts in Southern California. The resort is located along State Route 2 west of Wrightwood, California. The elevation of the resort is 6,600 feet (2,000 m) to 8,200 feet (2,500 m) for the Mountain High East Resort, 7,000 feet (2,100 m) to 8,000 feet (2,400 m) for the West Resort and 7,200 feet (2,200 m) to 7,800 ft (2,400 m) for the North Resort.

== History ==
Coinciding with the population growth of Southern California in the 1920s, hikers and ski enthusiasts began using Big Pines, an area near the present-day Mountain High resort. In 1929, construction began on the world's largest ski jump of that time in an attempt to attract the 1932 Winter Olympics.

The Mountain High West Resort was originally known as Blue Ridge and is one of the oldest ski resorts in the country. Its first year of operation was 1937 with a rope tow, and it built the second chairlift in California in 1947. In 1975, upon being sold by its original owners, it was renamed Mountain High.

The Mountain High East Resort, originally known as Holiday Hill, opened in 1948. In the 1960s, the cost of a lift ticket was $1.50. In 1979, the resort was sold to the new owner of the Mountain High resort and used primarily as parking for the West Resort, as well as added terrain (given adequate snow and skiing conditions.)

The Mountain High North Resort was originally known as Table Mountain Ski Area in 1938 and later changed to Ski Sunrise in 1975. Due to several years of poor snow conditions and a lack of snowmaking equipment, it was sold in 2004 to the owners of Mountain High. Mountain High now operates the North Resort as a ski school, tubing and snow play area to relieve congestion at the West Resort, but has not yet installed snowmaking equipment there. Table Mountain has been used previously as a U.S. Geological Survey site and a Smithsonian Museum site.

Mountain High was sold to Oaktree Capital Management in 1997. Valor Equity Partners acquired Mountain High in 2005. CNL Lifestyle acquired Mountain High in 2007 for $45 million (equivalent to $70 million in 2025) and leased it back to the resort's management. CNL sold the resort to Och-Ziff Capital Management in 2016. Resort management acquired the Mountain High property from Och-Ziff in 2017.

Mountain High narrowly survived the Bridge Fire in 2024.

== Resort ==
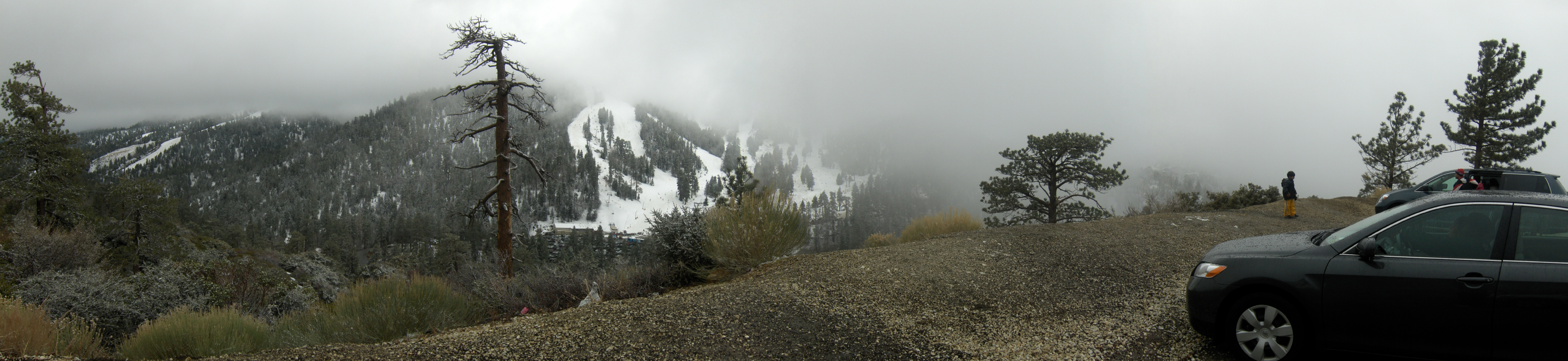
Mountain High Resort

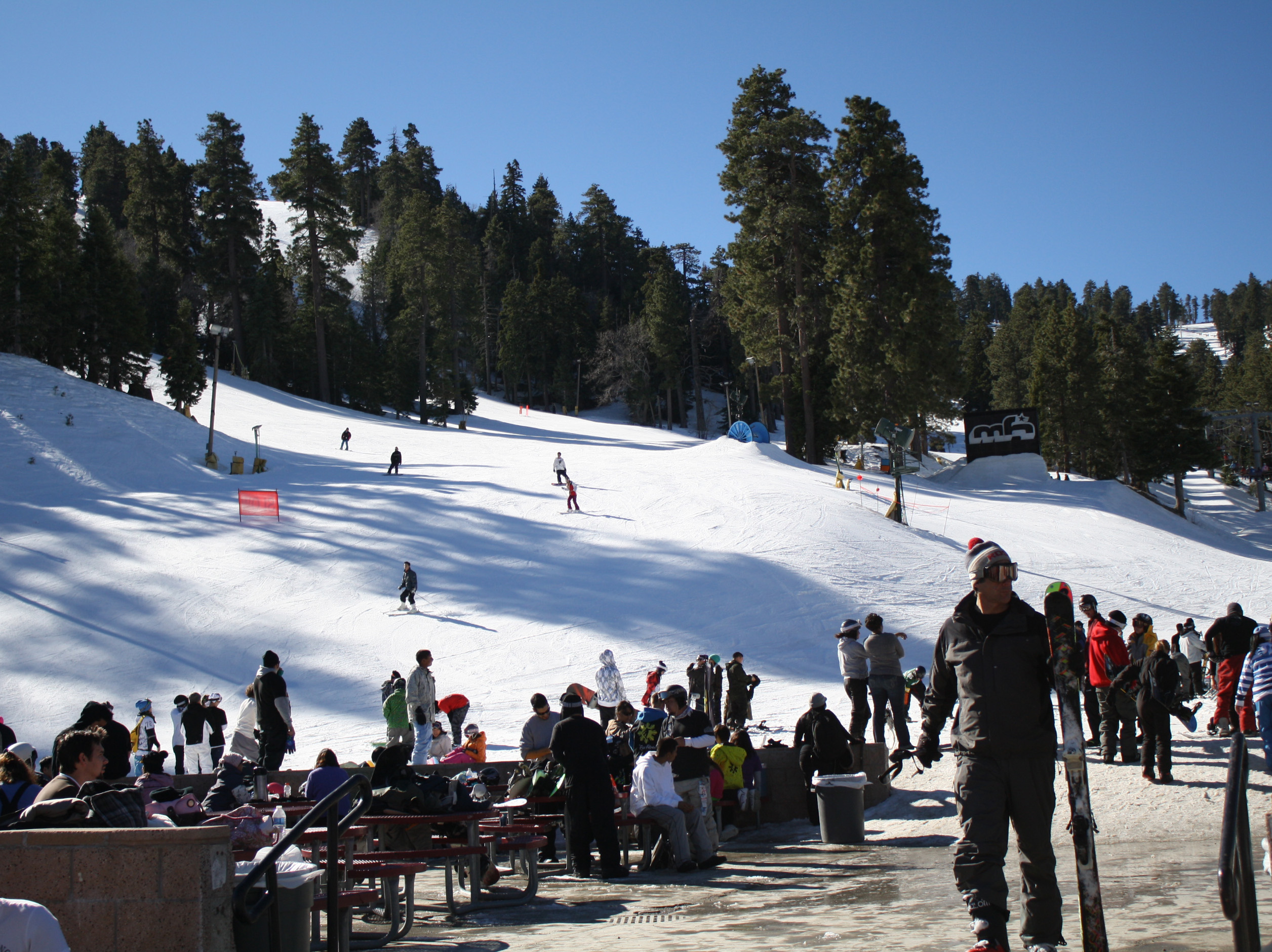
Mountain High

Mountain High's resort is separated into three different areas along State Route 2. Lift tickets purchased at any one of the areas are good at the other two, and a shuttle normally operates between the west and east resorts, ferrying skiers and snowboarders back and forth.

=== The Mountain High West Resort ===
At 7,000 feet (2,100 m) and 8,000 ft (2,400 m), the West Resort is the most popular of the three resorts, and most of its terrain has been dedicated to Mountain High's Terrain Park. The Terrain park contains many original terrain features such as the Slayer Box, and the Paradox catering mostly to the sport of snowboarding. Aside from the terrain parks, the West Resort also has excellent glade skiing and snowboarding in an area known as "The Reef." This area is only open when there is a substantial amount of snow. Due to its slightly higher elevation, the West Resort is often the first resort in Southern California to open due to its extensive snowmaking system consisting of both compressed air/water gun type and large water/fan units. This results in the West Resort also being one of the last southern CA resorts to close each year.

=== The Mountain High East Resort ===
At 6,600 feet (2,000 m)-8,200 ft (2,500 m) the East Resort has longer runs and more open terrain providing a more alpine snowsports experience. The longest run at Mountain High, Goldrush, is 1.6 miles (2.6 km) long and located at the East Resort, and is also the longest run in Southern California. Due to its daily sun exposure and lower base elevation, 100% of the resort has snowmaking capabilities using both the compressed air/water gun type and large water/fan units. Mountain High East was damaged slightly in the 2024 Bridge Fire; however, Mt High expects to open it by the ‘25/‘26 season.

=== The Mountain High North Resort ===
At 7,200 feet (2,200 m)-7,800 ft (2,400 m) the North Resort is dedicated to mainly beginner and intermediate terrain and snow play. This resort, formerly known as Ski Sunrise, only has one quad chair lift and three handle tows. It is also the location of the Yeti snow play area. In recent years, the North Resort has remained closed for skiing and snowboarding, because Mountain High has yet to install a snowmaking system there, causing them to rely on natural snowfall for a substantial snow base. Since ski resorts in Southern California often get less snow than their Northern counterparts, it's easy to see why operating a resort with limited snowfall is challenging. The resort is primarily a snow play operation as of the 2024/2025 season.

== Sky High Disc Golf Course ==
The Mountain High North Resort is open during the summer to offer disc golf. "Sky High" offers three courses with nine holes that meander throughout the Angeles National Forest. The course was first developed in 1999 by Dave Dunipace when the resort was still known as Ski Sunrise.

== Camping ==
Mountain High manages many recreation sites and campgrounds including the Table Mountain Campground, Mountain Oak Campground, Jackson Flat Campground, Appletree Campground, Peavine Campground, and the Lake Campground. These campgrounds are located in the Angeles National Forest and camping is only open during the summer months, starting in May.
