= Piney Creek =

Piney Creek may refer to the following places in the United States:

- Piney Creek (Kings River tributary), a stream in Arkansas
- Piney Creek (Illinois); see Piney Creek Ravine State Natural Area, Illinois
  - Piney Creek Site, a prehistoric rock art site
- Piney Creek (Monocacy River), Maryland; see List of rivers of Maryland
- Piney Creek Cove (Elk River), Maryland
- Piney Creek (St. Francis River), a stream in Missouri
- Piney Creek Wilderness, Missouri, a wilderness area named after the creek which runs the length of it
- Piney Creek Township, Alleghany County, North Carolina
- Piney Creek, North Carolina, an unincorporated community
- Piney Creek (Pennsylvania), a tributary of the Clarion River; see List of tributaries of the Allegheny River
- Piney River (Beech River tributary), a stream in Tennessee
- Piney River (East Tennessee), also known as Piney Creek in its upper reaches
- Piney Creek Falls, Tennessee
- Piney Creek (Neches River), Texas

== See also ==
- Big Piney Creek, Arkansas
- Big Piney Creek, namesake of the town of Big Piney, Wyoming
