= Line Fire =

2024 wildfire in Southern California, USA

- Part of the 2024 California wildfires
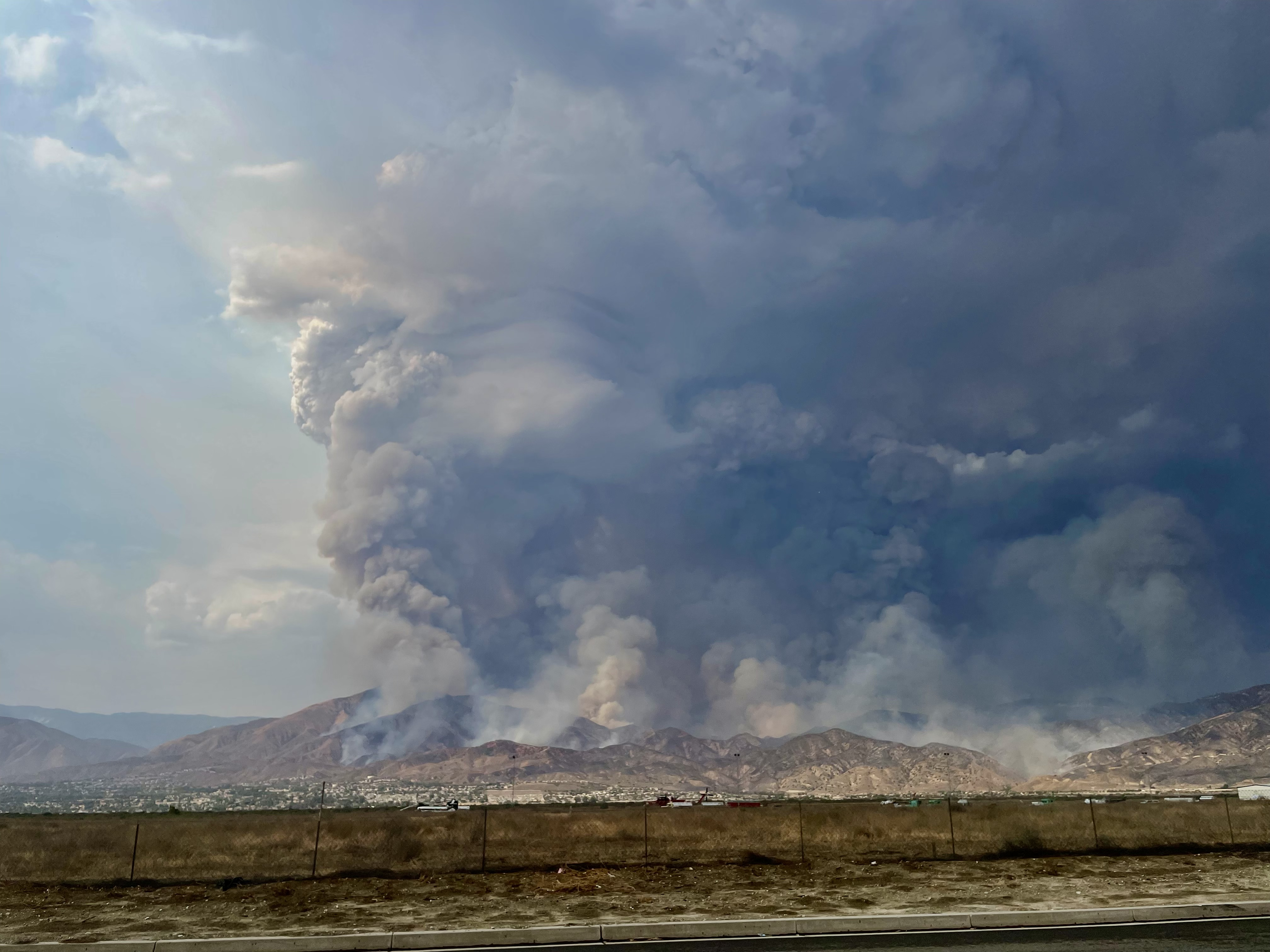
- The fire on September 7, looking north from the Redlands Municipal Airport staging area
- Date: September 5 –; December 23, 2024; (110 days)
- Location: San Bernardino County, Southern California, United States
- Coordinates: 34.121°N 117.155°W

Statistics
- Burned area: 43,978 acres (17,797 ha; 69 sq mi; 178 km^{2})

Impacts
- Deaths: 0
- Injuries: 6
- Structures lost: 1 destroyed; 4 damaged

Ignition
- Cause: Arson

Map
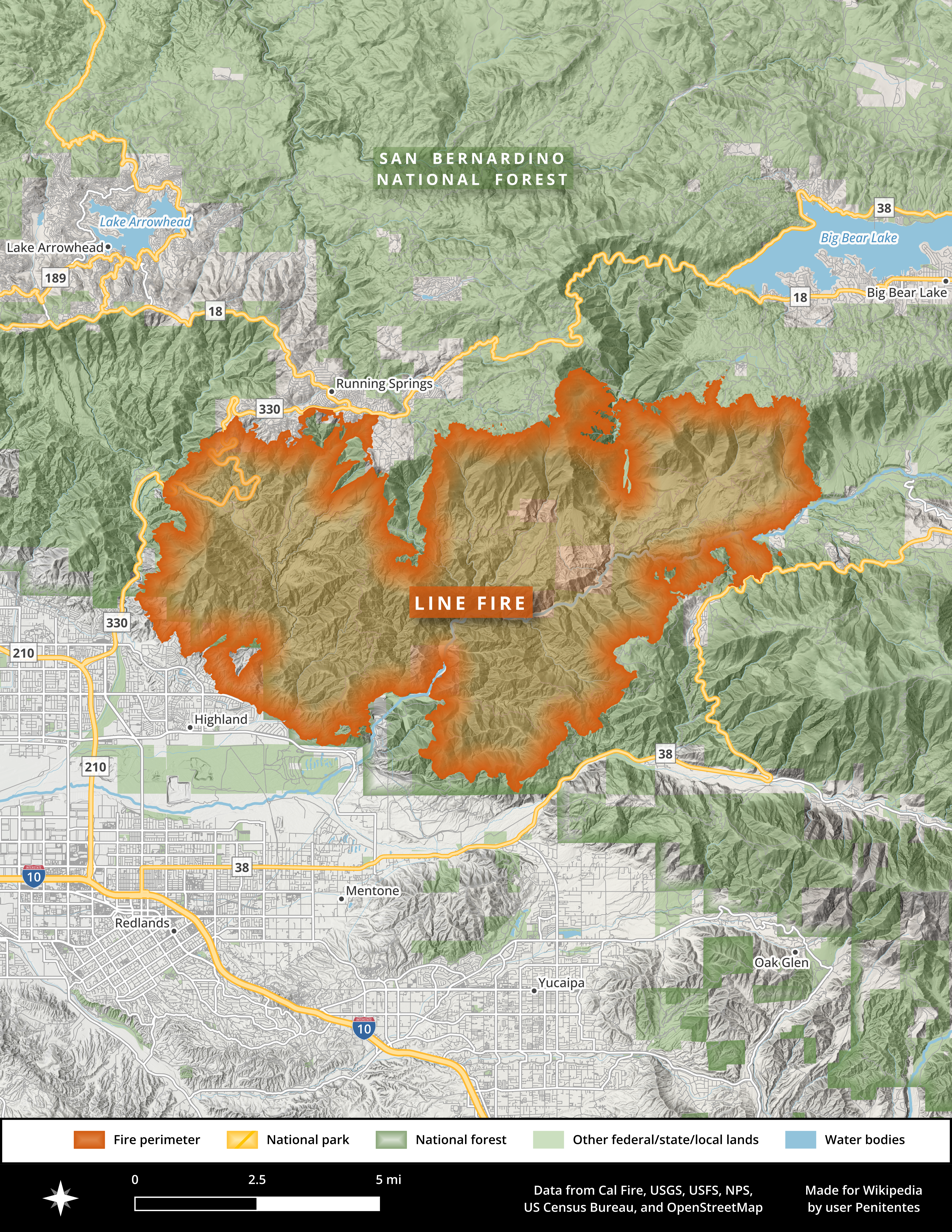
- The area burned by the Line Fire

- The general location of the fire, in Southern California

The Line Fire was a large wildfire that burned in San Bernardino County, California. The fire began on September 5, 2024, at 6:33 PM PDT near the community of Highland and spread into the San Bernardino National Forest. The fire forced the evacuation of multiple communities. On September 10, the San Bernardino County Sheriff's Department identified and arrested 34-year-old Justin Wayne Halstenberg, a resident of Norco, on suspicion of starting the fire on September 5. As of December 23, 2024, the Line Fire was reported as 100 percent contained at 43,978 acres (17,797 hectares).

== Background ==
The cause of the fire is believed to be arson. It began during a multiple-day heatwave in Southern California. Downtown Los Angeles reached 112 °F (44 °C), the third time that temperature had been reached since 1877.

== Progression ==
The Line Fire ignited on September 5 at around 6:00 p.m. PST along Baseline Road, near its intersection with Alpin Street in East Highlands. The fire was originally named the Baseline Fire. The fire spread from that point into the San Bernardino National Forest.

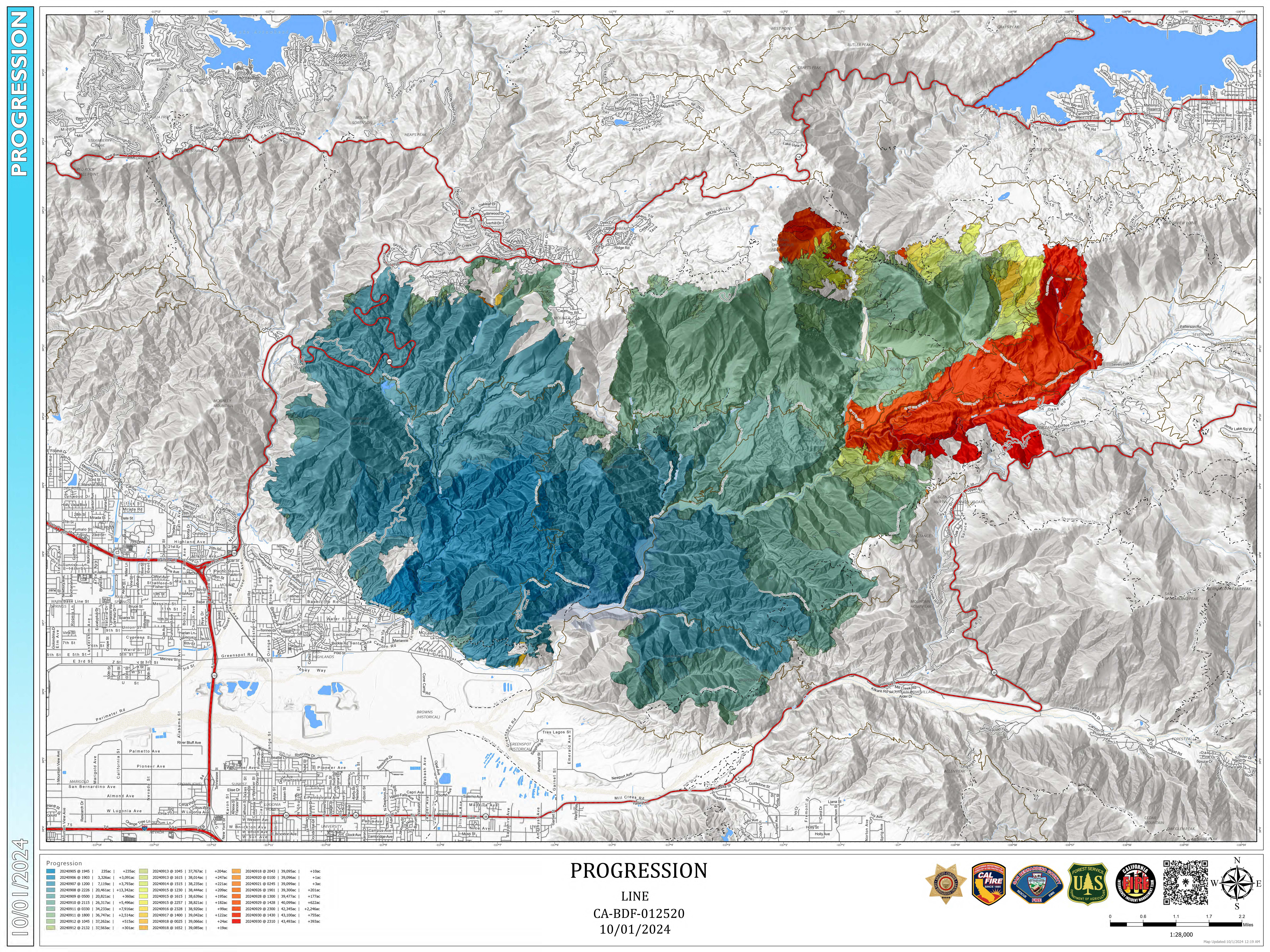
A progression map of the Line Fire as of October 1, 2024

The CAL FIRE Incident Management Team 3 was activated on September 6.

On September 7, the fire began to expand rapidly into the San Bernardino Mountains, prompting evacuation orders for the communities of Running Springs and Arrowbear Lake. Governor Gavin Newsom declared a State of Emergency in San Bernardino County, authorizing the use of a Fire Management Assistance Grant (FMAG) from the Federal Emergency Management Agency (FEMA).

Rain helped contain the Line Fire between September 7 and September 8, 2024, with a combination of rain and smoke visible.

The California National Guard was deployed, including four UH-60 Blackhawk helicopters, two C-130 aircraft, hand crews, and one military police company to assist with evacuations.

On September 29, the fire saw a large flare up as it burned through the Bear Creek and Santa Ana River drainages. The increase in fire activity prompted evacuation orders for the communities of Seven Oaks and Angelus Oaks.

As of December 23, 2024, the fire was reported as 100 percent contained at 43,978 acres (17,797 hectares).

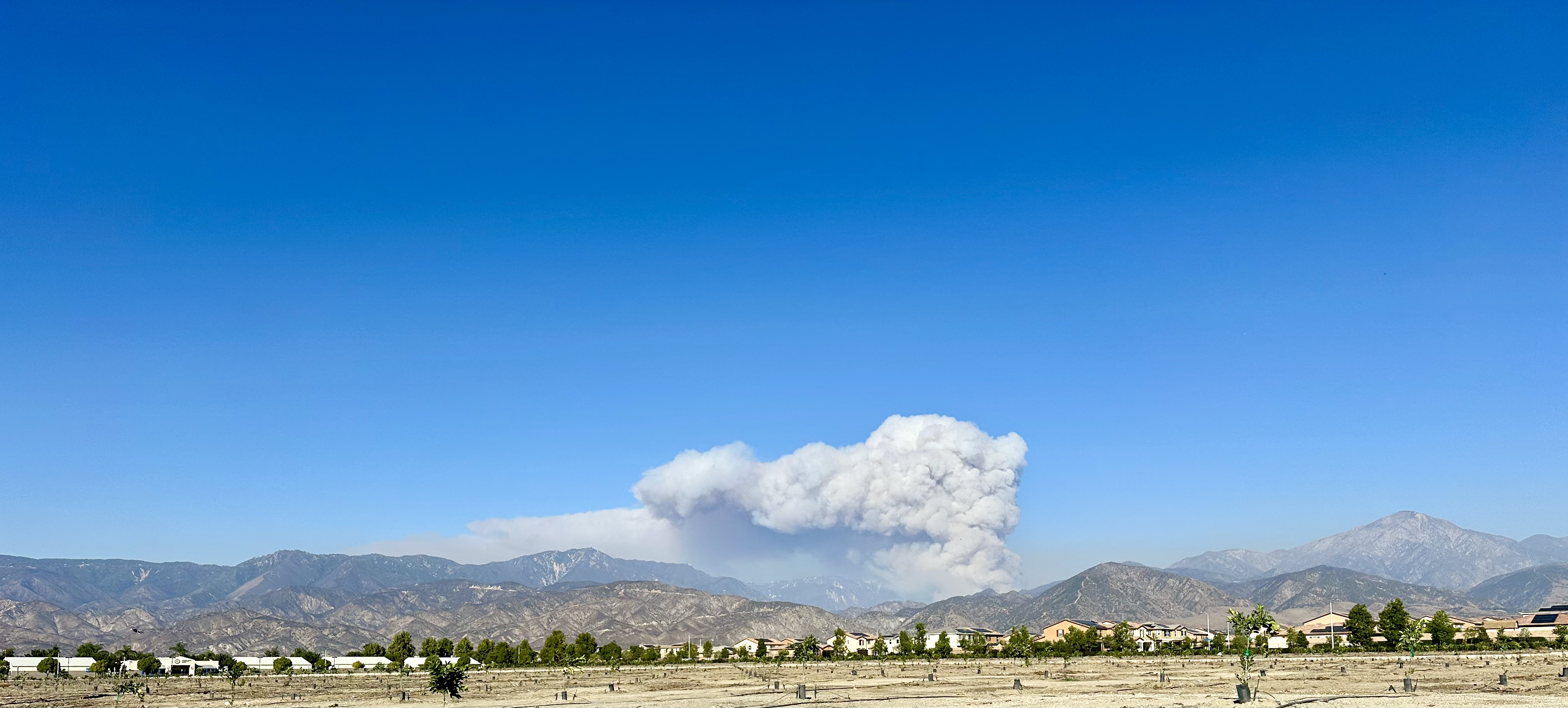
The Line Fire was visible from Redlands on September 29, 2024, twenty-four days after the fire began. San Gorgonio Mountain is the peak on the right.

== Effects ==
=== Evacuations ===
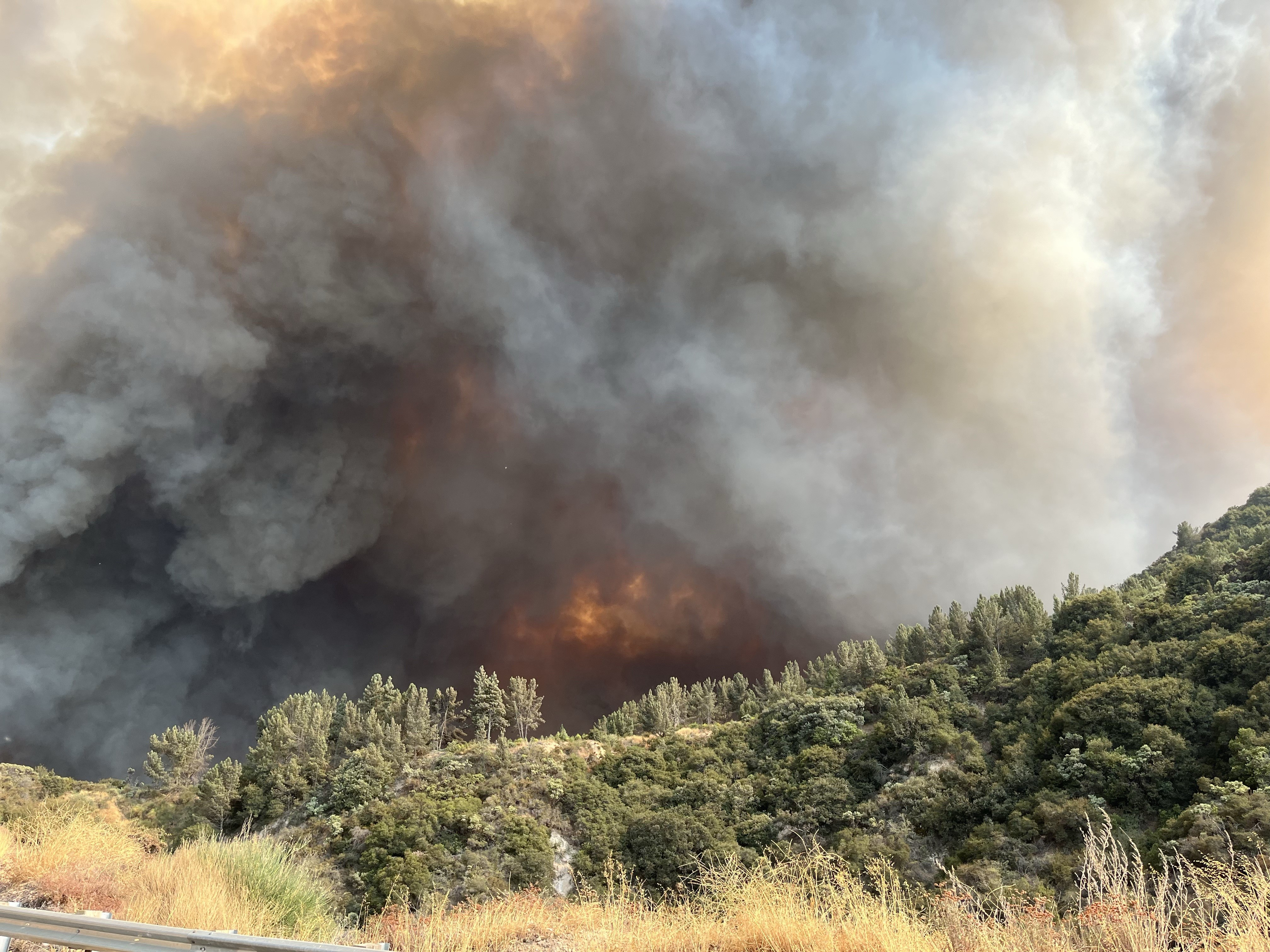
The fire on the morning of September 8, 2024

The Line Fire led to mandatory evacuation orders for over 9,200 homes. Initial evacuation warnings were issued for neighborhoods in East Highland in the early morning of September 6, 2024. By September 7, 2024, evacuation orders would be placed for neighborhoods along the foothills, extending into San Bernardino, and for neighborhoods east of Calle Del Rio.

Over the following days the mountain communities of Green Valley Lake, Cedar Glen, Lake Arrowhead, Crestline, Valley of Enchantment, and Big Bear Valley were placed under evacuation warnings. Mandatory evacuation orders were issued for Running Springs, Arrowbear Lake, Angelus Oaks, Seven Oaks, Forest Falls, and Mountain Home Village.

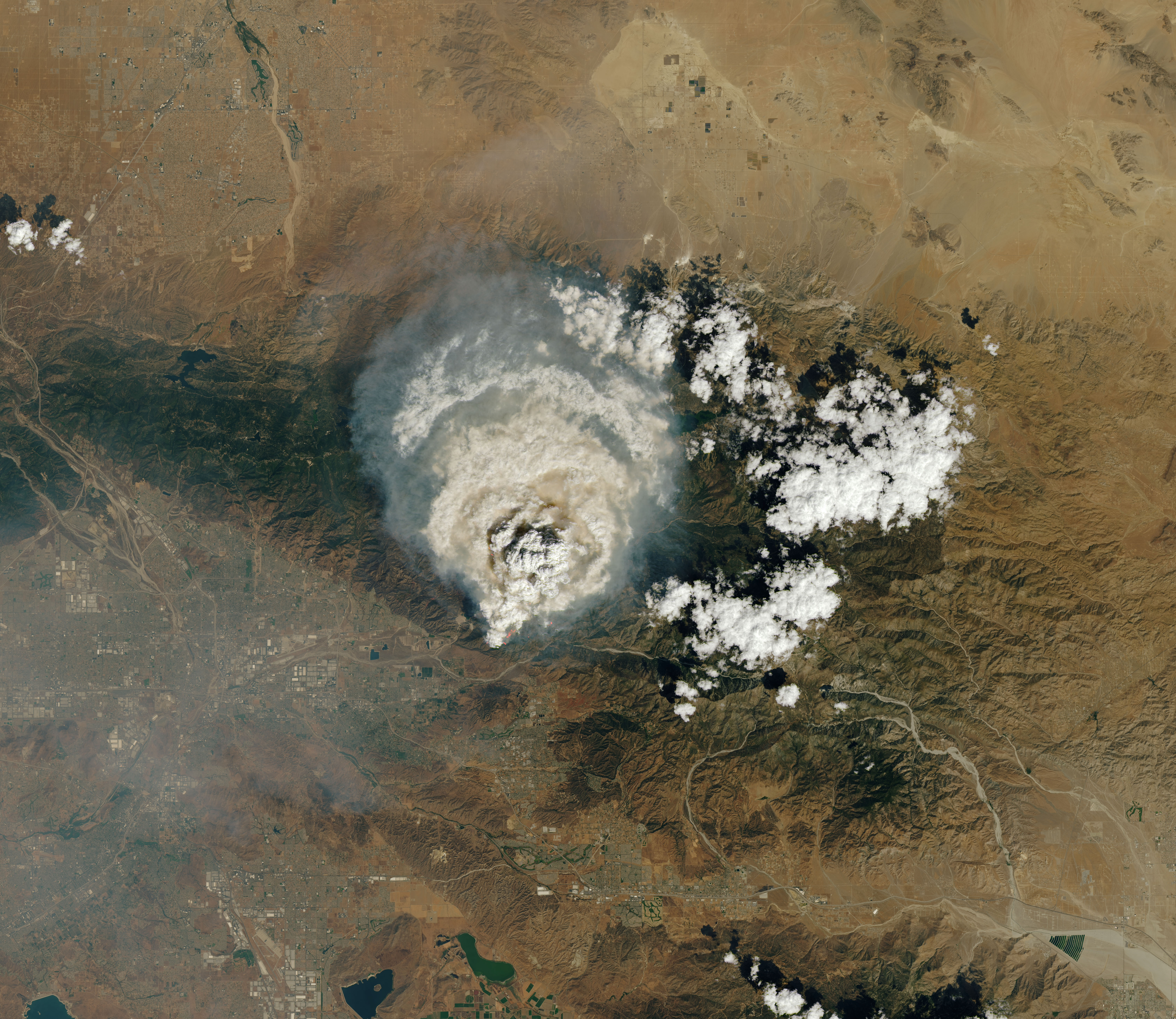
Landsat 8 satellite image of the smoke plume produced by the fire as it burned in the San Bernardino Mountains on September 9, 2024

=== Air quality related closures ===
The South Coast Air Quality Management District issued an advisory on September 6, warning of health impacts in areas affected by windblown smoke. On September 9, Rim of the World Unified School District closed campuses to students. Redlands Unified School District and Yucaipa-Calimesa Joint Unified School District closed all campuses to both students and staff. These closures would be extended through the end of the week on Friday, September 13.

San Bernardino Community College District closed both of their campuses September 9-13, 2024, and the University of Redlands temporarily transitioned all classes online.

=== Aviation ===
On September 9th, the Redlands Municipal Airport was closed to non-emergency aircraft. It was later reopened on September 20. On October 1, the Big Bear City Airport was closed on to non-fire-fighting aircraft due to increased fire activity. It has since reopened.

On September 7, CAL FIRE issued a warning against flying UAS (Unmanned Aircraft Systems) in or around wildfires, reporting that there had been two separate drone incursions into the Line Fire the previous day.

=== Destruction ===
As of October 24, there have been 4 confirmed damaged structures, 1 confirmed destroyed structures, and 6 confirmed injuries.

== Legal proceedings ==
On September 10, 2024, Justin Wayne Halstenberg, 34, was located and arrested on the suspicion of sparking the Line Fire. San Bernardino County prosecutors charged Halstenberg with him with 11 counts of arson, including using incendiary devices to set multiple fires. CalFire began an investigation, reviewing surveillance video and automatic license plate readers, which led investigators to conduct a search warrant at the home of Halstenberg, in the City of Norco. Investigators said they located evidence supporting his arrest in the house as well as the car. San Bernardino District Attorney’s Office stated the fire was ignited on Halstenberg’s third attempt start a blaze within an hour. The first attempt was reported and extinguished by firefighters. The second attempt was “stomped out by a good Samaritan.” On September 17, 2024, Halstenberg pleaded not guilty.

On May 23, 2025, Justin Wayne Halstenberg, was found guilty of starting the Line Fire. He was found guilty of seven counts related to the Line fire, and two counts related to a subsequent blaze, including aggravated arson of forest land and possession of flammable materials, according to the district attorney. Halstenberg faces a potential sentence of life in prison.

== Growth and containment table ==
Fire containment status Gray: contained; Red: active; %: percent contained;
Date	Area burned	Personnel	Containment
Sep 5	172 acres (0.70 km^{2})	-	
Sep 6	3,300 acres (13 km^{2})	-	
Sep 7	7,122 acres (28.82 km^{2})	628	
Sep 8	17,459 acres (70.65 km^{2})	1,855	
Sep 9	23,714 acres (95.97 km^{2})	1,890	
Sep 10	32,905 acres (133.16 km^{2})	2,684	
Sep 11	36,481 acres (147.63 km^{2})	3,158	
Sep 12	37,589 acres (152.12 km^{2})	3,398	
Sep 13	38,074 acres (154.08 km^{2})	3,993	
Sep 15	38,421 acres (155.48 km^{2})	4,103	
Sep 21	39,232 acres (158.77 km^{2})	2,956	
Sep 29	40,219 acres (162.76 km^{2})	1,195	
Oct 01	43,492 acres (176.01 km^{2})	1,776	
Oct 08	43,978 acres (177.97 km^{2})	1,651	
Dec 23	43,978 acres (177.97 km^{2})	252	

== See also ==
- Glossary of wildfire terms
- List of California wildfires
- 2024 California wildfires
