= Piney River (Beech River tributary) =

Stream in Tennessee, U.S.

Coordinates: 35.607293°N 88.347266°W

Piney River is a stream in the U.S. state of Tennessee. It is a tributary to the Beech River.

Piney River was named for the pine timber along its course.
