= Big Pine Creek =

Big Pine Creek may refer to:

- Big Pine Creek (California), Inyo County, California
- Big Pine Creek (Indiana), west-central Indiana
- Big Pine Creek (Texas)
