= Piney, Arkansas =

Piney, Arkansas may refer to:

- Piney, Franklin County, Arkansas
- Piney, Garland County, Arkansas
- Piney, Johnson County, Arkansas
- Piney, Pope County, Arkansas

== See also ==
- Piney Grove, Lafayette County, Arkansas
- Piney Grove, Pike County, Arkansas
