= Seven Oaks, California =

Unincorporated community in California, United States

- Unincorporated community
- Location within the state of California Seven Oaks, California (the United States)
- Coordinates: 34°11′11″N 116°54′51″W
- Country: United States
- State: California
- County: San Bernardino
- Elevation: 5,305 ft (1,617 m)

Population (2000)
  - Total: 289
- Time zone: UTC-8 (Pacific (PST))
  - Summer (DST): UTC-7 (PDT)
- ZIP code: 92305
- GNIS feature ID: 1661426

Seven Oaks is an unincorporated mountain community in the San Bernardino Mountains. It sits by the Santa Ana River, 7 miles northeast of Angelus Oaks. Seven Oaks Road leads to the neighboring community of Pinezanita, 3.5 miles west of Seven Oaks. It is located 4 miles off Highway 38. It is a resort community which was founded in 1845.

Seven Oaks is situated in the Santa Ana River Canyon, roughly halfway between the confluence of Bear Creek and the Santa Ana to the west, and the headwaters of the Santa Ana below Sugarloaf Mountain to the east. It sits four miles from the Highway 38, and may be reached from Glass Road, Forest Road and Seven Oaks Road. It is located next to Santa Ana River, a river which is popular for Trout and German Brown fishing.

It was named for the English town Sevenoaks, Kent by Charles M. Lewis in 1845. It was previously a sheep ranch, but developed into a resort community after the opening of Big Bear Lake, California. The community is now home to a lodge which dates back to 1876, and is also home to a bar, duck pond, restaurant and gift shop. It is also home to a swimming pool and numerous hiking trails to Barton Flats and nearby mountain destinations. It has been named the oldest resort town in Southern California.

Films such as The Girl Who Ran Wild (1922) and The Savage (1917) have been filmed in Seven Oaks.

A cabin burned down and a shootout took place here during the manhunt for officer Christopher Dorner in February 2013.

== History ==
Seven Oaks was established as a resort town in the late 1800s, located halfway up the San Bernardino’s to Big Bear. It was a frequent stop for burro riders using the burro trains up and down the Big Bear Valley Trail, developed by the Big Bear Valley Toll Road Company in 1888. Big Bear had become a popular tourist destination by 1900, and many travelers made a stop in Seven Oaks on the two-day journey up the San Bernardino Mountains. Seven Oaks was originally founded as a homesteading community by hunter Charles Matthew Lewis in 1875. He later established the Lewis Resort here which included 15 rental cabins, a restaurant and a post office in the 1890s. The resort was later sold to William Glass, who moved here with his wife Serena in 1912. The Glass family ran the resort until the 1960s.
