= Big Pines, California =

Unincorporated community in California, United States

- Unincorporated community
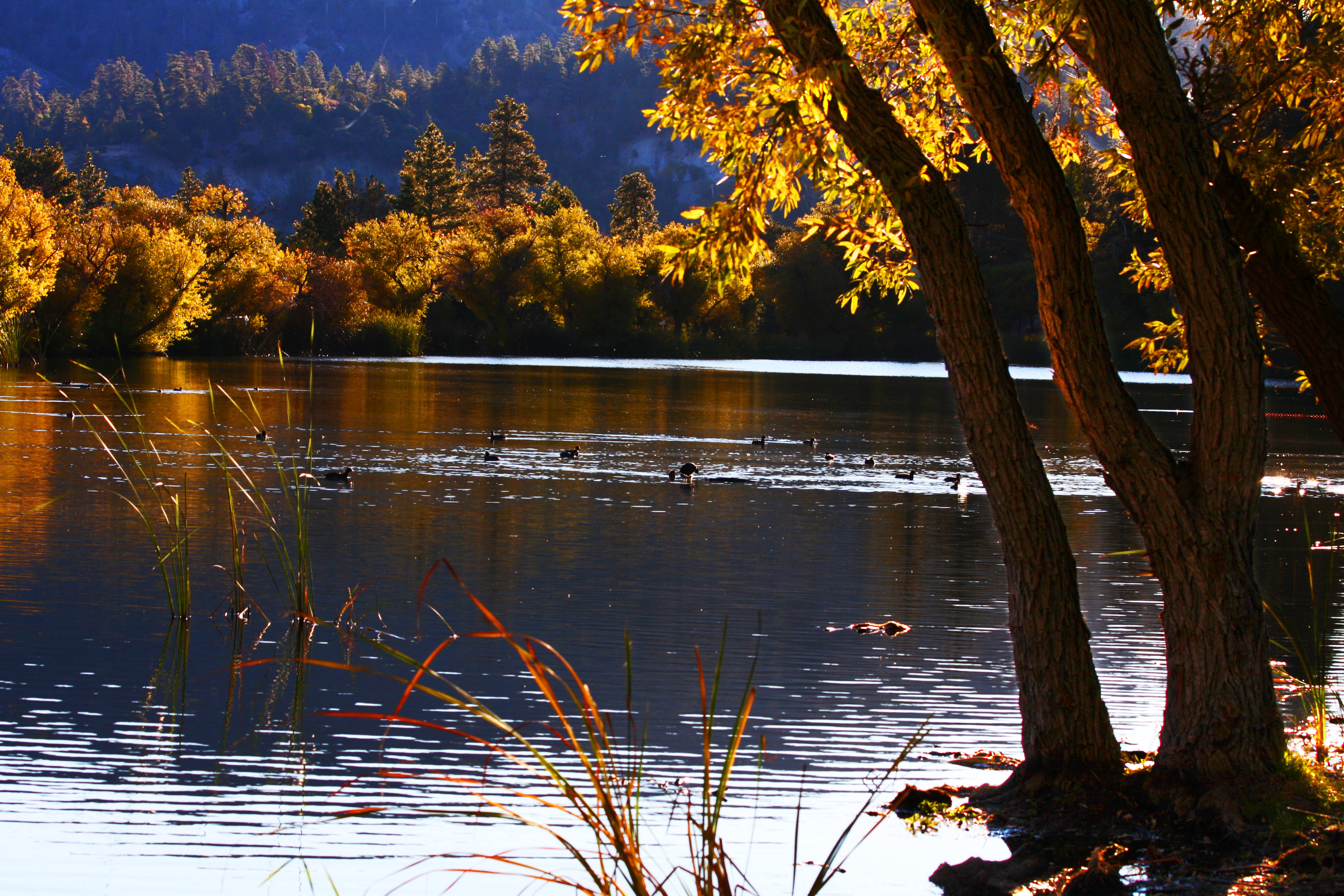
- Jackson Lake, west of Big Pines

- Location within the state of California Big Pines, California (the United States)
- Coordinates: 34°22′44″N 117°41′24″W
- Country: United States
- State: California
- County: Los Angeles
- Time zone: UTC-8 (Pacific (PST))
  - Summer (DST): UTC-7 (PDT)
- ZIP code: 92397
- Area codes: 760/442

Big Pines is an unincorporated community in Los Angeles County, California, United States. It is in the Angeles National Forest, San Gabriel Mountains.

== Geography ==
The community is located in the Swarthout Valley, which was first settled in 1851. It is bordered on the east by the San Bernardino County line and the town of Wrightwood.

It is the highest elevation settlement located on the San Andreas Fault.

To the west of Big Pines is Jackson Lake, a sag pond located on the San Andreas Fault. The lake is home to many recreational activities.

== Recreation ==
Big Pines began as a year-round recreation area built by Los Angeles County in 1924. It is a popular ski area close to Los Angeles, as it has a history of significant snowfall, even as late as May.

The Mountain High Ski Resort and the Table Mountain Observatory are located in Big Pines.

== See also ==
- Big Pines Highway
- Mountain High
- Wrightwood
- Carnival Boat a logging movie filmed on location in 1932
