= Retreat Fire =

2024 wildfire in Washington, USA

- Part of the 2024 Washington wildfires
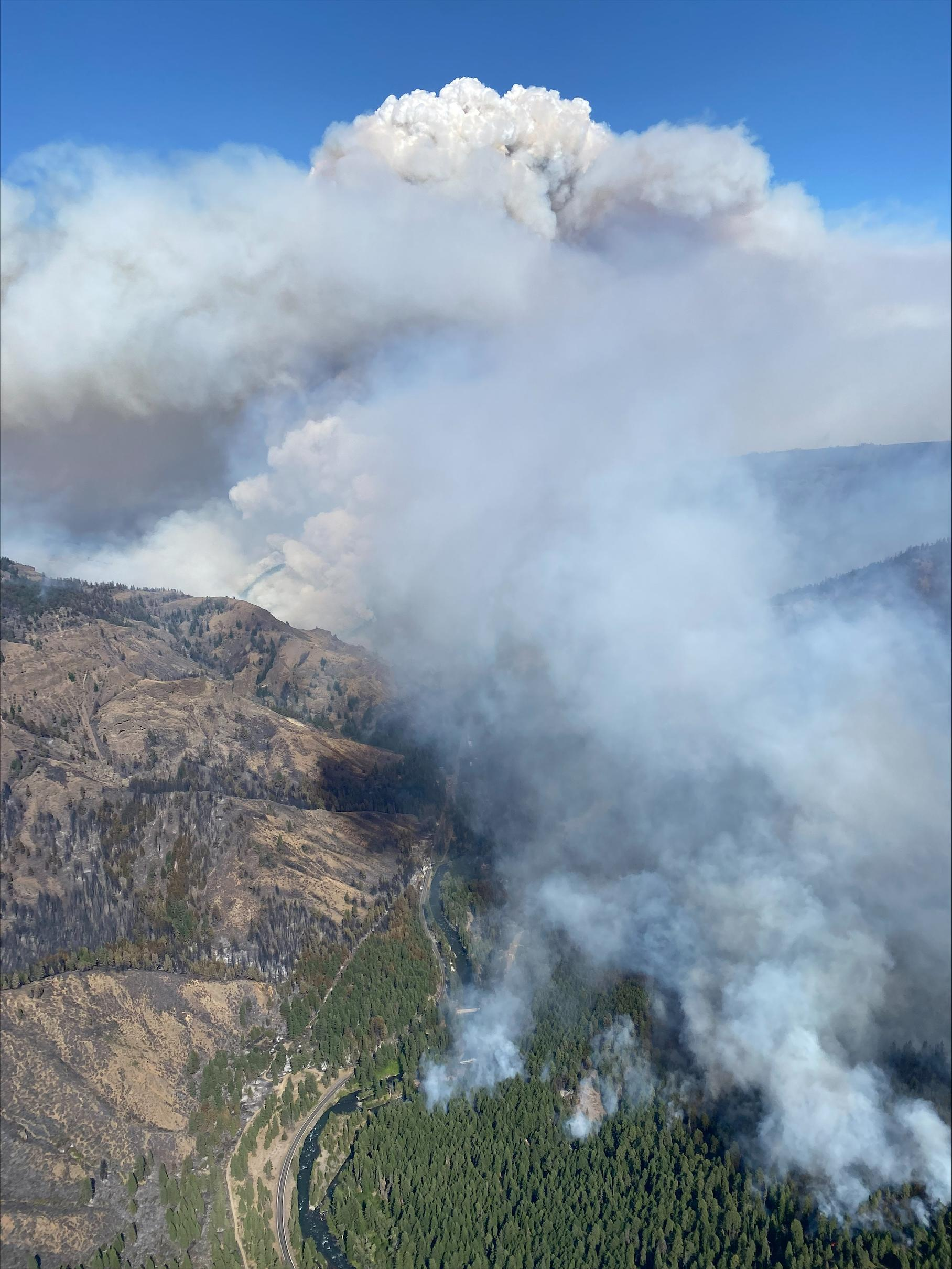
- Fire as seen from Rimrock Lake
- Date: July 23, 2024 - August 23, 2024
- Location: Rimrock Lake area Yakima County, Washington, U.S.
- Coordinates: 46°40′14.99″N 120°59′30.18″W

Statistics
- Burned area: 45,601 acres (184.54 km^{2})
- Land use: National Forest, rural area

Ignition
- Cause: under investigation

Map
- Perimeter of the Retreat Fire (map data)
- Approximate location of the Retreat Fire

The Retreat Fire or Rimrock Retreat Fire was a wildfire between Rimrock Lake and the town of Tieton in Yakima County, Washington.

The fire began on July 23, 2024 as the result of a house fire. As of August 12, 2024, it had burned over 45,601 acres (18,454 ha), including three residences and two other buildings.

The fire caused the closure of U.S. Route 12 across White Pass, and "evacuate now" orders were issued to residents near Rimrock Lake on July 24. Outdoor city amenities and events were closed in Yakima on July 25 due to poor air quality, which was "unhealthy" or "very unhealthy" for all people at monitoring stations across the Yakima Valley. An emergency across Yakima County was declared by the government on July 26.

A Red Cross shelter for displaced persons was opened on July 26 at the high school in Naches. Residents of Tieton were ordered to prepare to evacuate on July 28.

White Pass was closed from July 23 to August 17 due to the wildfire.

The more than century-old Tieton Main Canal was shut down by managers who were unable to assess damage from the fire. Much of the canal is not approachable by motor vehicle and must be repaired by teams on foot with wheelbarrows.

The fire burned many power poles leading up to the White Pass summit, which could take months to replace.

The evacuation order was lifted on August 16, and U.S. 12 was reopened on August 17, though portions were one lane only. As of September 8, 2024, the fire was contained though authorities were hesitant to declare it fully out until snow begins to fall. Repairs have begun on both the canal and U.S. 12.

== See also ==
- 2024 Washington wildfires
