= Tieton Dam =

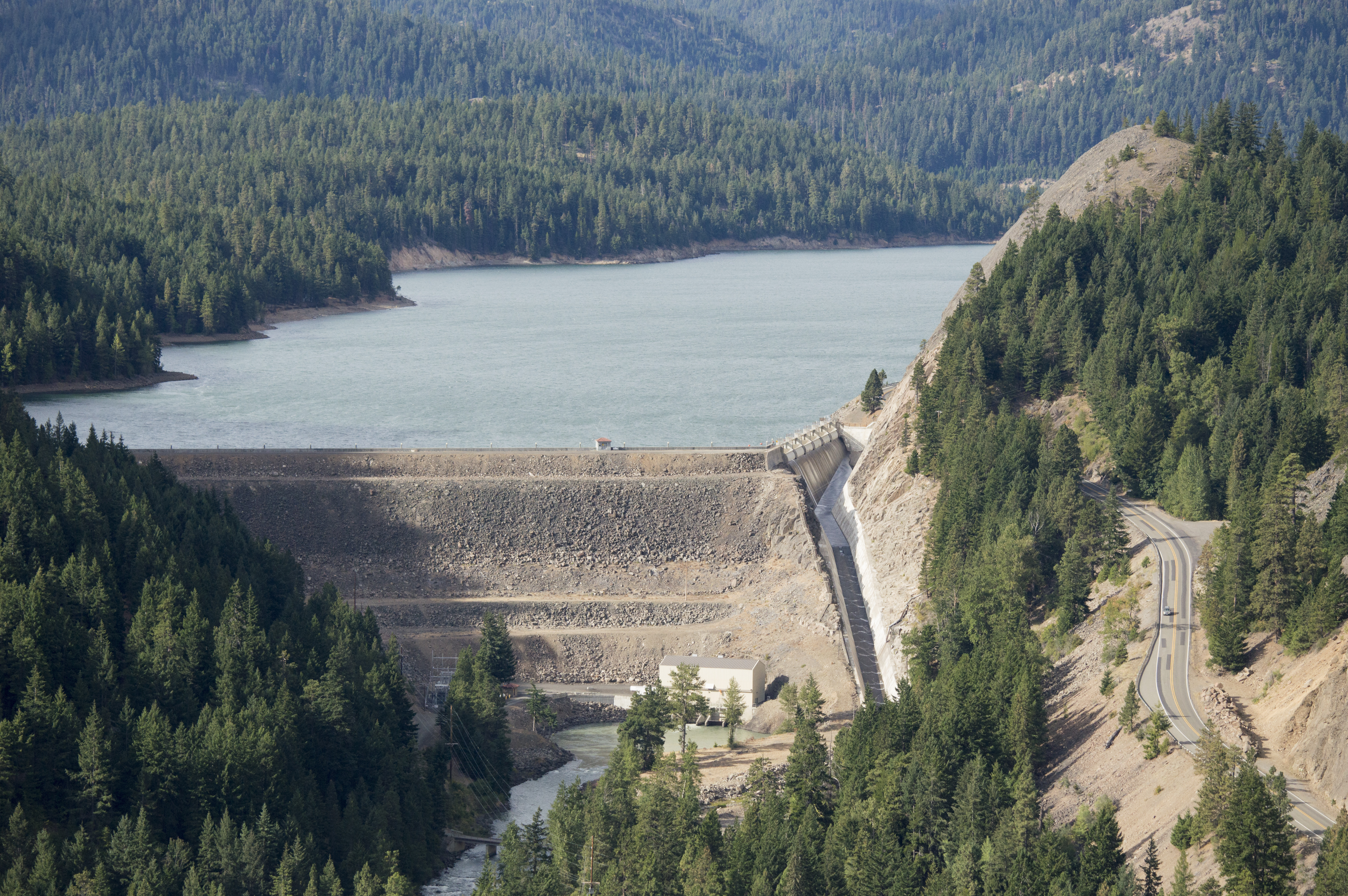
- Tieton Dam and Rimrock Lake from Lava Point
- Location: Yakima County, Washington, USA
- Coordinates: 46°39′23″N 121°7′46″W
- Opening date: 1925
- Operator(s): United States Bureau of Reclamation

Dam and spillways
- Impounds: Tieton River
- Height: 319 feet (97 m)
- Length: 920 feet (280 m)
- Dam volume: 2,049,000 cu ft (58,000 m^{3})

Reservoir
- Creates: Rimrock Lake
- Total capacity: 203,600 acre-feet (0.251 km^{3})
- Active capacity: 198,000 acre-feet (0.244 km^{3})
- Catchment area: 184 square miles (477 km^{2})
- Surface area: 2,674 acres (10.8 km^{2})

Tieton Dam is an earth and concrete type dam on the Tieton River in Yakima County, in the U.S. state of Washington. The dam began operation in 1925. Its reservoir, Rimrock Lake, has a total capacity of 203,600 acre-feet (0.2511 km^{3}) with a normal operating capacity of 198,000 acre-feet (0.244 km^{3}) that provides water for agricultural irrigation. This dam is a component of the Yakima Project. Tieton Dam also produces electricity for Burbank Water and Power and Glendale Water and Power, near Los Angeles. The Southern California Public Power Agency installed two 7 megawatt generators in a project started in 2010. The power is transmitted over the Pacific DC Intertie that runs from Celilo, Oregon to Sylmar, California. Upstream from the dam, the river is impounded by Clear Creek Dam, another element of the Yakima Project. About 8 miles (13 km) downstream from the dam, the Tieton River is tapped for the Tieton Main Canal.
