= Jane Orleman =

- Born: 1942 (age 83–84)
- Education: Central Washington University
- Spouse: Richard C. Elliott (m. 1971; died 2008)
- Website: reflectorart.com/jane/

Jane Orleman (b. 1942) is an American artist, based in Ellensburg, Washington. Orleman's paintings explore the distinction between professional artistic practice and art therapy, as a reflection on her experience with childhood trauma.

Orleman is also the co-creator of Dick and Jane's Spot, a project that transforms her personal residence in Ellensburg into an art exhibition, featuring works in painting, sculpture, and found objects. Dick and Jane's Spot features works by Orleman, her late husband Richard C. "Dick" Elliott (1945–2008), and dozens of other artists from the American Northwest.

== Biography ==
Orleman was born in 1942, and grew up in New York State. She attended multiple universities before enrolling at Central Washington University in 1969, where she changed her field of study to fine arts. Orleman met fellow art student Dick Elliott at CWU, and they married in 1971, the year of Orleman's graduation. The couple briefly lived in Dick's hometown of Portland before returning to Ellensburg, where they purchased a house in 1978 that quickly became Dick and Jane's Spot. The couple opened a janitorial business, operating from the house and using the proceeds to support their art.

Orleman's work in paintings began in earnest during her studies at CWU, but she found herself unable to create art in the late 1980s. Following the death of her mother in 1989, Orleman sought therapy for her creative block, and came to the realization that the abuse she experienced as a child was holding her back. Orleman's works in therapy, created in her studio, were shown publicly for the first time in 1992 in Ellensburg. In the preparation for the exhibition, titled Telling Secrets: An Artist's Painful Story of Childhood Abuse, Orleman feared that the tight-knit Ellensburg community would react negatively to her story, which had been suppressed for 30 years. Instead, the public's reception was positive, and the works featured in the exhibition expanded to a body of work of over 350 paintings. Orleman's 1998 book, Telling Secrets: An Artist’s Journey Through Childhood Trauma, was published by the Child Welfare League of America.

In the 2000s, Orleman shifted focus in her paintings, working on a larger scale, and taking on a more psychedelic quality. Her husband Dick Elliott suffered an accident while working on a neon sign in 1995, which led to mercury poisoning. Elliott's health declined steadily, but his work continued, with Orleman's support. In addition to her own artistic practice, Orleman worked with Elliott on promoting and creating his artworks, abstract patterned works created with thousands of retroreflectors. Elliott died in 2008 from pancreatic cancer, and Orleman has since participated in the restoration and preservation of his works, including the 2022 restoration of Elliott's installation Circle of Light at the Yakima SunDome.

In 1998, Orleman and Elliott reached an agreement with the Yakima Valley Museum to bequeath their entire art collection upon both of their deaths. In her 2017 announcement of the bequest, Orleman expressed her wish that Dick and Jane's Spot serve as a home for artists-in-residence.

== Artworks ==
=== Paintings to 1989 ===
Orleman's early paintings address themes of domesticity, and assert her disapproval of traditionally-held notions of femininity, according to museum studies scholar Janet Marstine. Her paintings of this era often depict interiors, with contrasting themes of sanctity and chaos. Marstine comments that Orleman's paintings of the 1980s feature "an iconography of central core imagery in which she organizes her compositions around a central cavity that becomes a metaphor for the female body," referencing the concept of the Great Goddess.

=== 1990s paintings ===
Orleman's paintings from the late 1980s forward reflect her experience in therapy, confronting her childhood history of trauma and sexual abuse. Orleman's first works of this era, created in therapy, are described by art education researcher Hyunji Kwon as "largely symbolic in a cosmic setting to distance herself from her horrifying early life experience."

These more symbolic works quickly progressed to more literal representations of Orleman's traumatic experiences. In a review of Orleman's 1992 exhibition at the Henry Art Gallery, Seattle Times art critic Deloris Tarzan Ament described Orleman's then-contemporary works as depicting "her childhood anguish, and the rage that went with it, in painfully graphic ways."

Other examples of Orleman's works in the early 1990s are less literal, and feature representational depictions of her physical anger. One painting of this era, I Feel (1991), was created with her father's butcher knife used as a palette knife. The use of the knife held special significance to Orleman, as it was the same knife that narrowly missed injuring her many times during her childhood. Orleman stated in a 2020 retrospective that she completed I Feel in 45 minutes, and "became engulfed in a state of euphoria" upon using the knife and confronting its memories.

Marstine further argues that Orleman's paintings of this era, in combining professional artistic practice and art therapy, render the distinction between the two useless. Orleman's field of work to date, Marstine concluded, "underscores the importance of rejecting the dualism of art versus art therapy, a patriarchal construct that maintains artmaking as a masculine enterprise."

Orleman's paintings in the 1990s, which total over 350 works, were followed by the publication of a book detailing her life experience, experience in therapy, and artistic philosophy. Telling Secrets: An Artist’s Journey Through Childhood Trauma was published by the Child Welfare League of America in 1998, funded by a grant from the Paul Allen Foundation.

=== Dick and Jane's Spot ===
Orleman and her husband Dick Elliott began an art project at their personal residence in Ellensburg in 1978, titled Dick and Jane's Spot. Since its inception, Dick and Jane's Spot has grown steadily, with the additions of new studio space in 1990 and 2004 to support the artists' works. Dick and Jane's Spot features works from Orleman, Elliott, and dozens of artists from the American Northwest, with a generally utopian theme. Their motto for the project, "one hearty laugh is worth ten trips to the doctor," is seen in the humorous, irreverent, and ever-changing nature of Dick and Jane's Spot.

=== Later works ===
Orleman describes her works from 2000–present as "mural sized canvases expressing my reflections on life, love, time, space and eternity." An exhibit of Orleman's 21st-century works in 2023, titled Looking In Again, features paintings of various scales. The works are inspired by her sketches from the beginning of her career, including themes of a "central figure" mirroring her earlier works referencing the Great Goddess, and featuring a psychedelic color scheme.

== Publications ==
- Orleman, Jane (1994). "Looking In—Looking Out: An Artist's Journey through Childhood Sexual Abuse". Art Therapy. 11 (1): 62–65. doi:10.1080/07421656.1994.10759046. ISSN 0742-1656.
- — (1998). Telling Secrets: An Artist’s Journey Through Childhood Trauma. Washington, DC: CWLA Press. ISBN 978-0-87868-729-9. OCLC 1131252322.
- — (November 2, 2020). "Dragging My Baggage into Paradise". Artist Trust.
