= 2024 Washington wildfires =

Natural disasters in the USA

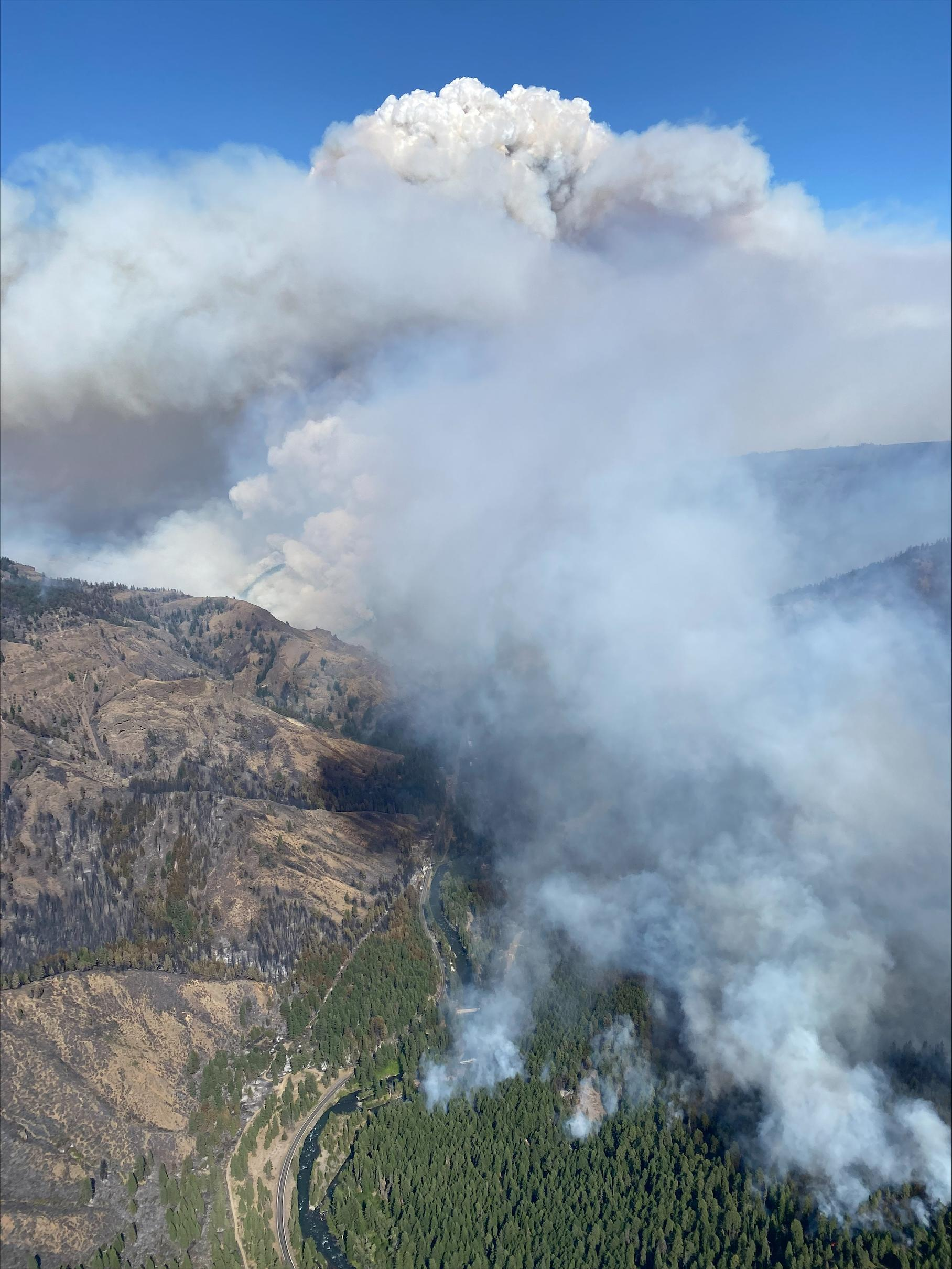
- Retreat Fire from Rimrock Lake
- Date: March 2024 – December 2024

The 2024 Washington wildfire season were a series of wildfires that had been burning throughout the U.S. state of Washington.

== Background ==
While the typical "fire season" in Washington varies every year based on weather conditions, most wildfires occur in between July and October. However, hotter, drier conditions can allow wildfires to start outside of these boundaries. Wildfires tend to start at these times of the year after moisture from winter and spring precipitation dries up. Vegetation and overall conditions are the hottest and driest in these periods. The increase of vegetation can make the fires spread easier.

== Events ==
Predictions for the 2024 fire season made by the National Interagency Fire Center in June 2024 included temperatures above normal and precipitation below normal, due to the ENSO transition to a La Niña pattern, resulting in an above normal fire potential for Western Washington in July through September.

On July 10, the Washington State Department of Natural Resources announced a burn ban on its lands that would last until at least September 30. The ban was issued in response to several large, human-caused wildfires amid the statewide drought emergency and drier-than-normal weather across Washington. The largest fire at the time was the Pioneer Fire in the Okanogan–Wenatchee National Forest near Lake Chelan, which had grown to more than 12,000 acres (4,900 ha).

On October 30, the Washington State Department of Natural Resources announced the end of the 2024 fire season. Over 300,000 acres were burned by wildfires in Washington state in 2024.

== List of wildfires ==
The following is a list of fires that burned more than 1,000 acres (400 ha), or produced significant structural damage or casualties.

Name	County	Acres	Start date	Containment date (Note: Containment means that fire crews have established and secured control lines around the fire's perimeter. These lines are artificial barriers, like trenches or cleared vegetation, designed to stop the fire's spread, or natural barriers like rivers. Containment reflects progress in managing the fire but does not necessarily mean the fire is starved of fuel, under control, or put out.)	Notes	Ref
Pioneer	Chelan	38,735	June 8	October 3	Town of Stehekin ordered to evacuate (by boat) on the morning of July 28	
Nisqually John	Whitman	1,221	June 14	June		
Beam Road	Yakima	8,542	June 15	June 18		
Neff Road	Walla Walla	1,435	June 15	June		
Slide Ranch/Mission Road	Yakima	3,106	June 22	July 9	Began on Yakama Reservation, arson	
Joe Barker Road	Walla Walla	1,436	July 3	August 14		
Road 11	Ferry	1,422	July 4	July		
Cougar Creek	Asotin, Garfield	24,095	July 15	August 29		
Swawilla	Ferry & Okanogan	53,462	July 17	August 15	Closed State Route 21 and Keller Ferry, evacuations of Keller and the Buffalo Lake area	
Easy	Okanogan	2,130	July 17	October 1	Closed North Cascades Highway (SR 20)	
Miners Complex	Snohomish, Skagit	1,098	July 19	October 31		
Bridge Creek	Ferry	3,998	July 19	August 4		
Davin Road	Franklin	1,948	July 21	July		
Black Canyon	Yakima	9,211	July 22	August 1		
Bighorn	Klickitat	51,569	July 22	July 30		
Retreat	Yakima	45,601	July 23	August 23	Closed US-12, caused evacuations and county-wide declaration of emergency	
Lower Granite	Garfield	14,482	July 29	August 2	At least one structure destroyed.	
Williams Mine	Skamania County	13,092	August 5	November 1	People near Trout Lake evacuated; Mount Adams Wilderness and part of the Pacific Crest Trail closed	
Calcite Creek	Okanogan	4,500	August 5	August 25	Pyrocumulus cloud generated a few miles away in Manning Provincial Park, Canada; NOAA potential fire alerts less than a mile from the border; Pasayten Wilderness trails closed beginning August 6.	
Ruby	Whatcom	1,336	August 9	October 31		
Road 2620	Jefferson	445	August 14	August 28	Roads and trails including Mount Jupiter trail closed, homes threatened around Duckabush	
Stayman	Chelan	3,118	August 20	August 24		
Goosmus	Ferry	1,738	September 25	October 4		
Long Hollow	Whitman	4,000	September 26	September 27		
Jack Wells	Okanogan	8,373	October 1	October 21	Evacuations for parts of Brewster.	

Perimeters of 2024 Washington wildfires (map data)
