= Dick and Jane's Spot =

Art project in Ellensburg, Washington, US

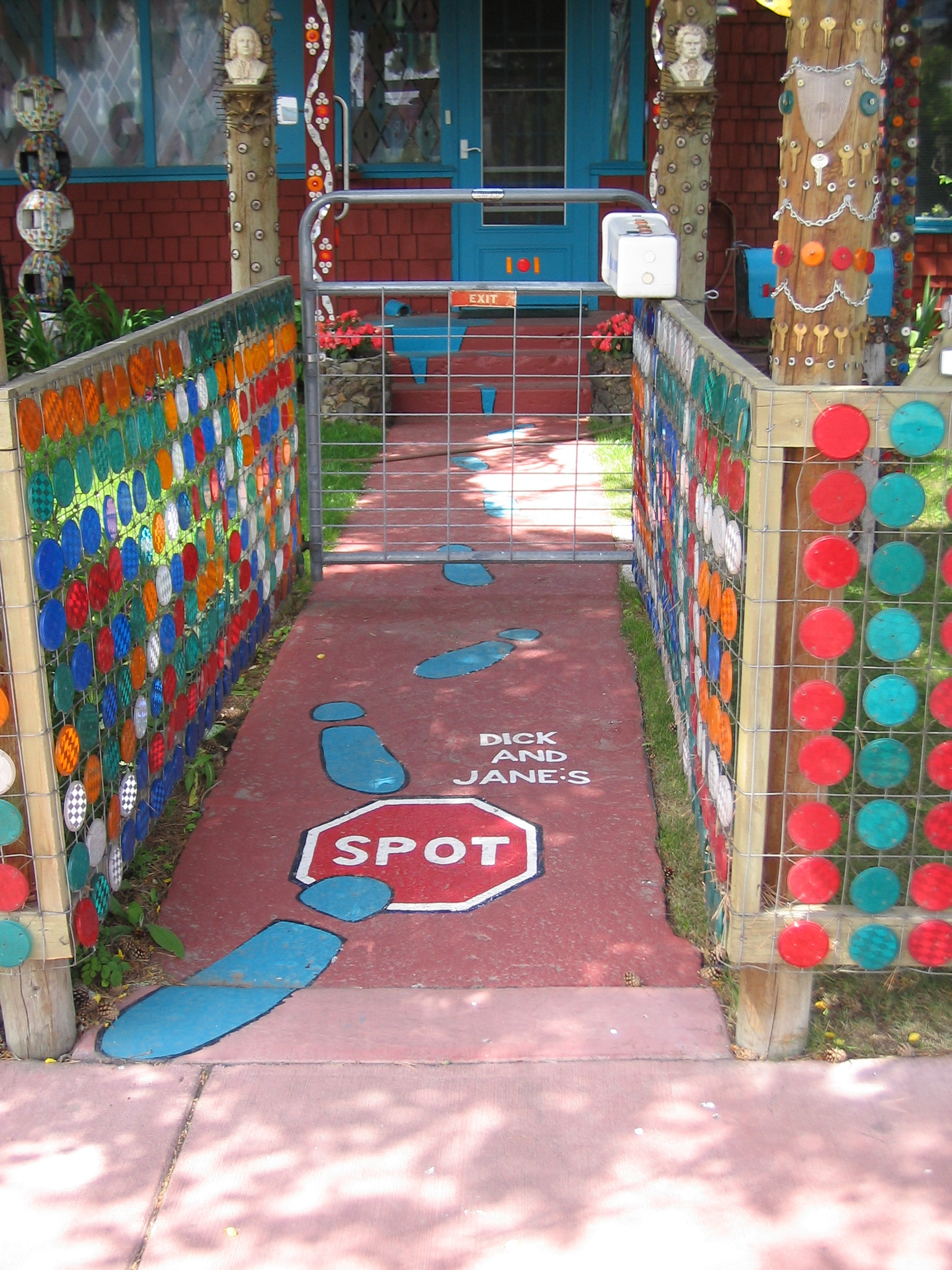
- Artist: Jane Orleman, Richard C. Elliott
- Year: Began 1978 (house built c. 1890)
- Medium: Mixed materials, including paint, neon signs, and retroreflectors
- Movement: Outsider art
- Location: Ellensburg, Washington
- 46°59′33″N 120°32′51″W
- Website: reflectorart.com/spot/

Dick and Jane's Spot is an outsider art project in Ellensburg, Washington, created by artists Jane Orleman and Richard C. Elliott at their longtime residence. The exterior of Dick and Jane's Spot features artworks created by Orleman, Elliott, and over 40 other artists from the Pacific Northwest. As the personal residence of the artists, the interior of Dick and Jane's Spot is not open to the public.

== History ==
Dick and Jane's Spot is the personal residence of artist Jane Orleman and her late husband Richard C. "Dick" Elliott (1945–2008). Orleman and Elliott met while studying at Central Washington University, and spent a year living in Portland before returning to Ellensburg.

Orleman and Elliott purchased the house at 101 North Pearl Street in 1978. The house's oldest parts date back to before 1890, and it was planned to be demolished for a city parking lot. The house's owner was frustrated with the slow pace of negotiations with the city, and instead listed the house for sale for $18,000, equivalent to $68,000 in 2024.

Art at the house began with a pair of pink plastic flamingos and a fence decorated with found objects, and evolved into decorations on the house itself and the entire yard. The couple began the project with the motto of "one hearty laugh is worth ten trips to the doctor," seeking to bring joy to the house and its surroundings. By 1989, Dick and Jane's Spot featured 100 separate artworks by over 30 artists. In an interview with The Seattle Times that year, Elliott described Dick and Jane's Spot as "a private museum for folk art" and "a humane society for lost art."

Orleman and Elliott constructed additions to the house in 1990 and 2004, providing additional studio space. The collection at Dick and Jane's Spot has expanded and changed steadily since its inception, with some artworks being modified onsite, such as a figure of Uncle Sam becoming "Aunt Sammy." Other artworks, such as the Spinner Tree, have been modified, dismantled, toured around the country, and removed permanently.

== Artworks ==
Museology scholar Janet Marstine, in a 2002 analysis of Orleman's field of work, argues that "the yard-art project is to Orleman an effort to remake her home into an unspoiled Eden." Marstine highlights Orleman's stylized interpretation of the totem pole in multiple statues, including Big Red, a female figure with reflectors for nipples; and Big Dick, a response to Orleman's 1984 hysterectomy. Orleman's artworks at Dick and Jane's Spot continue her previous works' themes of analyzing the domestic sphere, and are distinguished from her other works with a distinct focus on humor and utopian positivity.

Elliott's works at Dick and Jane's Spot include multiple installations of his signature patterned retroreflectors, which decorate fences, walls, and walkways. His works in neon are also represented.

The artworks by Orleman and Elliott at Dick and Jane's Spot represent their distinct styles. Elliott's abstract works with retroreflectors stand in contrast to Orleman's more symbolic and inwardly focused works in painting and sculpture.

Early installations at Dick and Jane's Spot include a series of fences, constructed from power line insulators salvaged from the Grand Coulee Dam; a 6-foot-tall (1.8 m) hand acquired from a fortune teller; and a heart-shaped brick fountain nicknamed the "Heart of Washington."

== Future ==
Orleman and Elliott have willed their entire personal collection, including Dick and Jane's Spot, to the Yakima Valley Museum. The artists reached an agreement with the museum in 1998, and Orleman announced the bequest in 2017, following Elliott's death in 2008. The intention of the bequest is to create a home for artists-in-residence.
