= Washington Women's History Consortium =

- Founded: 2005
- Type: Historical; Educational charity
- Purpose: History of women in Washington State
- Location(s): State Capital Museum and Outreach Center in Olympia, Washington
- Website: washingtonwomenshistory.org

The Washington Women's History Consortium is a nonprofit organization that works to document, preserve, and disseminate historical information about the contributions and achievements of women within the state of Washington. The organization was established in 2005 by the state legislature and is managed by the Washington State Historical Society, supported by an advisory board that is appointed by the state governor and legislature. The Consortium is located at the Washington State Capital Museum and Outreach Center in Olympia.

== Organizational background ==
The Washington Women's History Consortium was established in 2005, by the Washington State Legislation (RCW 27.34.360). The initial goal of the Consortium was to collect historical documentation about the contributions and achievements that Washington women have made, in preparation for a 2010 celebration honoring the Centennial of Women's Suffrage in the state. The centennial celebration was held on November 8, 2010, and was known statewide as the "Day of Jubilation". The celebration included music and theatrical performances, speeches, and a court re-enactment.

In 2006, the Consortium created a comprehensive Web site that provides access to digital images and documents that have been contributed by legislatively mandated partners throughout the state. These partners receive financial support from the Consortium to collaborate and assist in the collection and preservation of historical information that is used in the online Women's History Consortium Collection. Associate partners are currently digitizing collections of historical materials for their organizations, using the Consortium's proprietary software.

As of 2012, statewide legislatively mandated partners include the Washington State Library and Archives (operated by the Secretary of State), Western Washington University, the University of Washington, the Evergreen State College, Central Washington University, Eastern Washington University, Washington State University, and the Northwest Museum of Arts & Culture in Spokane. Associate partners include the Everett Public Library and the Yakima Valley Museum.

The Women's History Consortium Collection serves as a centralized digital database of resources that pertain to the research and study of women's history in Washington state. The collection improves the availability of historical information about women's contributions and achievements, primarily focusing on the latter half of the 20th century. Areas of study include the history of women in the military, politics, suffrage, education, entertainment, fashion, and sports. Accessible resources include biographies, oral histories, newspaper archives, organizations, timelines, digital publications, museum exhibits, photographs, and personal papers.

== Membership ==
Membership in the Washington Women's History Consortium is mandated by law to ensure a representative of citizens from throughout the state. The organization is managed by the Washington State Historical Society, supported by a board of advisors consisting of 15 members including private citizens, business, labor, historical societies, educational institutions, tribes, and public officials.

The governor is responsible to appoint 11 members to the board of advisors, representing a cross-section of individuals from throughout the state to ensure a diverse membership based on geographic location, demographics, and subject-matter expertise. Two members are chosen by the President of the Senate from among the Washington State Senate, each representing the two largest caucuses. The Speaker of the House of Representatives is responsible to appoint the final two members, each representing the two largest caucuses of the house of representatives.

== Recognition ==
- In 2010, the Women's History Consortium and Washington State Historical Society received a $215,000 grant from the National Endowment for the Humanities for "Washington Women's History: Providing Access and Preservation for Important Collections through the Washington Women's History Consortium". The grant was designated as a "We the People" award, which honors organizations, projects, and programs that "encourage and enhance the teaching, study, and understanding of American history, culture, and democratic principles".
- In 2011, the Washington Women's History Consortium was honored with an Award of Merit by the Leadership in History awards committee of the American Association for State and Local History for their Women's Suffrage Centennial Commemoration.
