= Richard C. Elliott =

American multimedia artist, 1945–2008

- Born: 1945; Portland, Oregon
- Died: November 19, 2008 (aged 63); Ellensburg, Washington
- Education: Central Washington University
- Spouse: Jane Orleman (m. 1971)
- Website: reflectorart.com/dick/

Richard C. "Dick" Elliott (1945 – November 19, 2008) was an American multimedia artist, based in Ellensburg, Washington. Elliott's site-specific works used layered and patterned retroreflectors on an epic scale. Elliott and his wife Jane Orleman are the creators of Dick and Jane's Spot, an art installation at their residence in Ellensburg.

== Early life and education ==
Elliott was born in Portland, Oregon in 1945, the son of Jenkin and Marian Elliott. The second of four siblings, Elliott was drawn into sports as a child, lettering in baseball, basketball, football, and tennis in high school. Elliott was dyslexic, and struggled in grade school, finding solace in sports and eventually art. His family moved to the Portland suburb of Lake Oswego when he was in third grade. Elliott graduated from Lake Oswego High School in 1963, and enrolled at Central Washington State College in Ellensburg, Washington.

Elliott studied art at Central Washington and involved himself in the antiwar movement, leading him to suspend his studies and join the Volunteers in Service to America program. Elliott's initial assignment in 1966 sent him to Pilot Station, Alaska, a Yup'ik city of 250 people on the Yukon River, 80 mi (130 km) inland from the Bering Sea. Elliott quickly developed an admiration for his hosts' way of life, contrary to his initial perceptions. Following a year in Alaska, Elliott spent a year on another VISTA assignment in Neah Bay, Washington with the Makah people.

Returning to Central Washington in 1968, Elliott returned to studying art, and burned his draft card on the steps of the student union. He withdrew from school in 1969, returning to Oregon. Elliott's conscientious objector application was rejected, but he was never called up for service. He reenrolled at Central Washington a year later, and completed his studies in art in June 1971.

== Career ==
=== Early career and works in graphite ===
Elliott worked with graphite from 1974 to 1981, depicting realistic, large-scale landscapes in monochrome. While drawing one such landscape, a 42 in × 22 in (107 cm × 56 cm) view of the Kittitas Valley, Elliott had an epiphany about the earth, consciousness, and Western art. In the aftermath of his realizations, Elliott abandoned realism. In a 1999 retrospective, he described his epiphany as leading to "[a] new art form, with new ways of thinking about imagery, light, time, space, and the human drama."

In combination with his works in graphite, Elliott and Orleman created Dick and Jane's Spot, an ever-changing installation at their residence in Ellensburg. The project began shortly after the couple purchased a house in 1978, and was inspired by the aesthetic of outsider art. Elliott protested this categorization at times, commenting that "Even though we didn't pay attention in class, we aren't totally untrained."

The results of Elliott's epiphany came to a head after a late-night acid trip in January 1983, when Elliott sat down at his kitchen table in with a black felt-tip pen and paper, and began a series of intricate compositions of dots. The monochrome drawings, published in chronological order of creation as 127 Meditations by Dick Elliott, are described by biographer Sheila Farr as "the kind of effect the Op artists of the era had been investigating, spiraling, throbbing, eye-popping imagery took hold in a short-lived art movement that fit the psychedelic mood of the era."

=== Works in reflectors and neon ===
Following Elliott's epiphany, and his stated focus to reconsider "imagery, light, time, space, and the human drama," he sought out alternative methods to depict light in his artwork. Elliott initially experimented with safety reflectors at Dick and Jane's Spot, before moving on to including them in paintings, initially in combination with other reflective elements such as glitter. In 1987, he made a connection with Sate-Lite of Niles, Illinois, a manufacturer of bicycle reflectors in five colors: red, amber, blue, green, and clear. Elliott settled on these five colors as primary colors for his artwork, evoking the technique of pointillism.

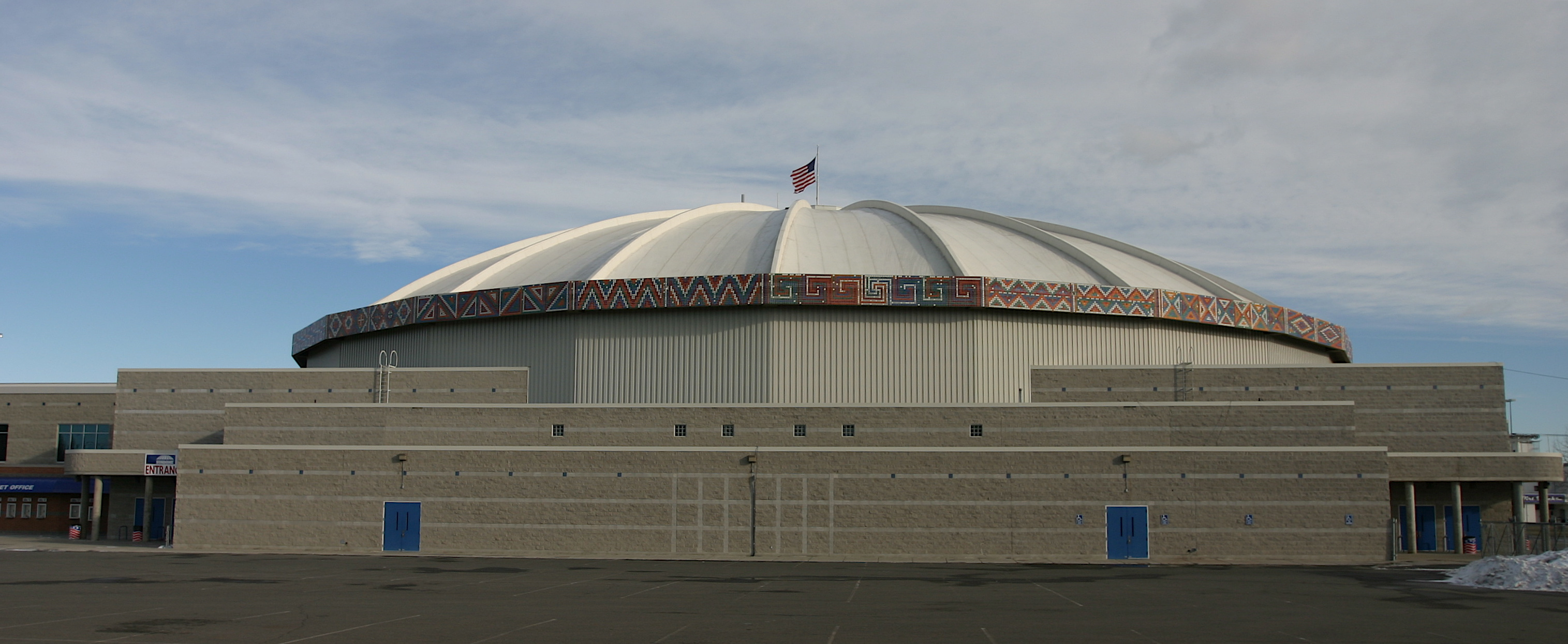
Circle of Light (1992), Yakima SunDome, Yakima, WA

Elliott developed a technique for layering and patterning safety reflectors in the late 1980s, and received a patent for the process in 1992. Elliott described his use of reflectors as providing near-photographic reproduction of designs, in a manner similar to four-color photographic reproduction. In the 1990s, Elliott experimented with neon, and studied for three months at the Neon Art and Tube Bending School in Portland.

Elliott's smaller-scale works in reflectors were similarly site-specific. In a 1990 review of his exhibition at the Mia Gallery in Seattle, Seattle Times art critic Karen Mathieson described the patterns in Elliott's works as having "a sureness in execution that mutes the faux naive tenor of the materials." In the 1990 exhibition, titled Reflective Paintings, part of the gallery was left unlit, with flashlights provided for illumination.

The largest of Elliott's works in reflectors, which he describes as "reflective paintings," is Circle of Light (1992) at the Yakima SunDome. Circle of Light forms a ribbon around the upper structure of the SunDome, incorporating designs derived from Yakama basketry patterns and Elliott's own concepts. Circle of Light incorporates over 48,000 3-inch (7.6 cm) reflectors in a 5 1/2 ft × 880 ft (1.7 m × 268.2 m) design, encircling the structure of the SunDome.

=== Final artworks ===
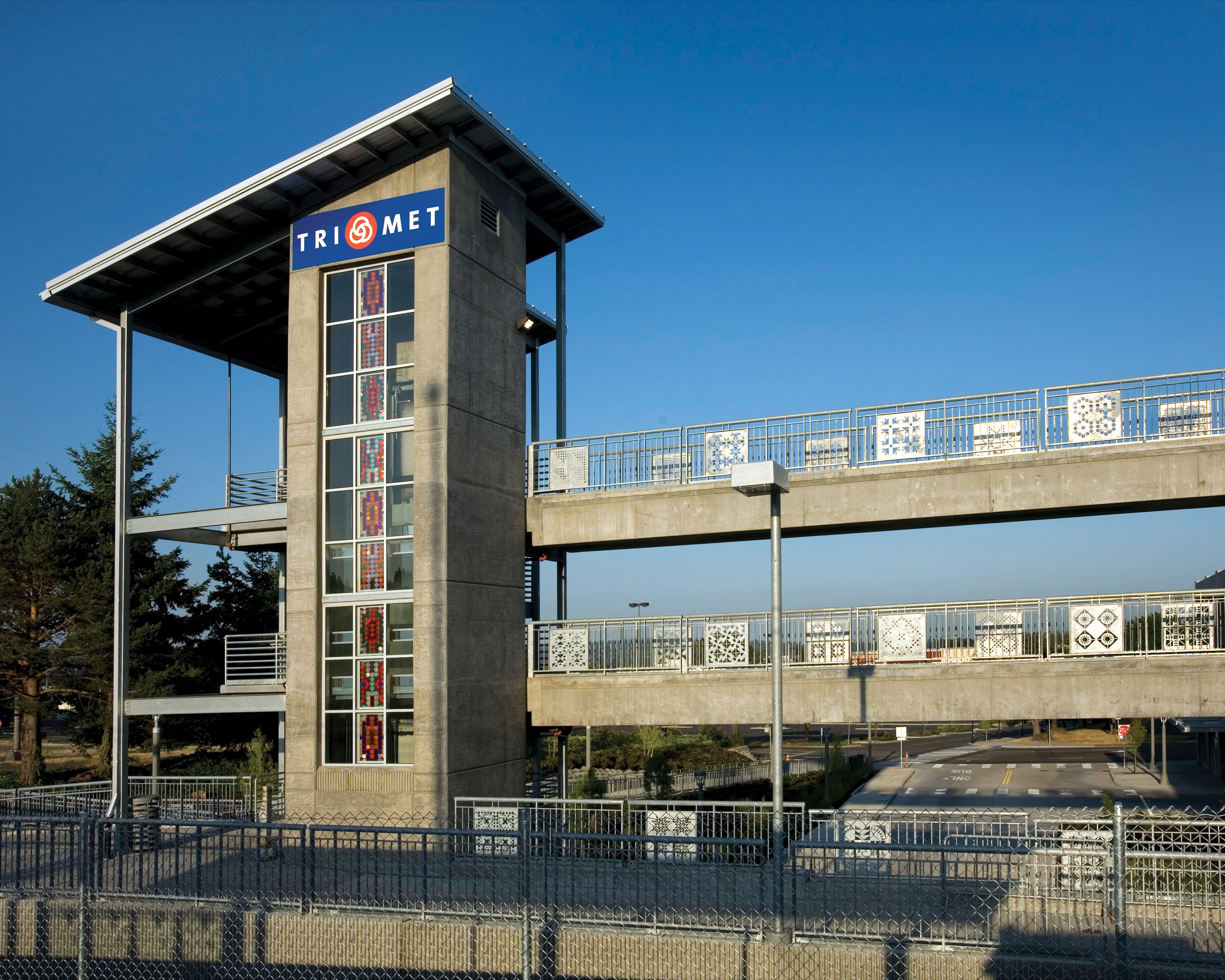
Chain of Life (2008), Clackamas Town Center Transit Center, Clackamas, OR

In the final years of his life, Elliott returned to two-dimensional works, revisiting the themes of his 1980s works. His compositions of the 2000s, on canvas and inkjet prints, reference the intricate, psychedelic geometric patterns of 127 Meditations. Elliott's final two-dimensional works are the Vibrational Field Paintings series.

Elliott was awarded multiple commissions for public art installations in the final years of his life, often in connection with public transit and infrastructure projects. A notable example of Elliott's works of this era is Sound of Light (2007), a site-specific installation of reflectors in Seattle for the Link Light Rail system. Sound of Light spans two blocks, and features a series of rhythmic, "mandala-like" patterns. Americans for the Arts honored Sound of Light in 2008 in its Public Art Network Year in Review, highlighting it as one of the country's foremost public artworks.

Another example of Elliott's final site-specific works is Thunder over the Rockies (2007), located at Belleview Station in Denver, which transforms a pedestrian tunnel into a contemporary, reflective cave painting. Elliott's final installation is Chain of Life (2009), which features a chronology of human life in pattern: Clackamas basket patterns in pavers, quilt patterns from early European settlers of Oregon, and a double helix in reflectors.

== Personal life ==
Elliott met fellow Central Washington art student Jane Orleman in 1971, introduced by mutual friend Bob Boyd. Elliott and Orleman married later that year, and following Orleman's graduation at the end of the summer 1971 term, the couple moved back to the Portland suburbs. Within a year, Elliott and Orleman found suburban life stifling, and they decided on a day's notice to leave Oregon and hike across the country to Maine.

The trek to Maine was unsuccessful, with Orleman and Elliott abandoning their trip at the 100-mile (160 km) mark near Biggs Junction, Oregon. They settled for a summer in a rented farmhouse in Madras, Oregon, and decided to return to their college town of Ellensburg. After a few years in Ellensburg, Orleman and Elliott purchased a house in 1978 that quickly became Dick and Jane's Spot.

Elliott became involved in civic affairs in Ellensburg, unsuccessfully running for city council twice, and serving on the city's Downtown Taskforce for a decade. Elliott and Orleman advocated for the purchase and installation of the Ellensburg Bull, a sculpture by Richard Beyer inspired by the city's Western heritage. Ellensburg Bull, cast in aluminum and installed in 1986, depicts a bull seated on a park bench with a cowboy hat in his lap.

Elliott was seriously injured in 1995 in a mercury poisoning accident. The incident occurred while he was working with neon, and left him partially incapacitated for years. Elliott was diagnosed with pancreatic cancer in 2007, and died on November 19, 2008.

== Legacy ==
The reflectors of Circle of Light, Elliott's first large-scale commission, were replaced in 2022 in a restoration effort led by the Washington State Arts Commission. In the decades since their installation by Elliott and a team of two, many of the reflectors had fallen or lost their vibrancy. The manufacturer of the original reflectors was engaged to produce new reflectors for the restoration, including a special production run of three colors that were no longer in regular production.

Reflections on the Columbia (1992), a patterned artwork on two water towers in Pateros, Washington, was destroyed in the Carlton Complex Fire of 2014. 17,000 new reflectors were installed to restore the work in 2016, as a symbol of Pateros' recovery.

== Publications ==
- Elliott, Richard C. (2009) [first pub. 1999]. "An Infinite Point In Time: The Visually Sensuous and Emotionally Joyous Art of Richard C. Elliott" (PDF). Yakima, WA: Yakima Valley Museum.
- US patent 5079644, Elliott, Richard C., "Multi-layered reflective structure and method of making same", issued January 7, 1992

== See also ==
- Dick and Jane's Spot
