= Swawilla Fire =

2024 wildfire in Washington, USA

- Part of the 2024 Washington wildfires
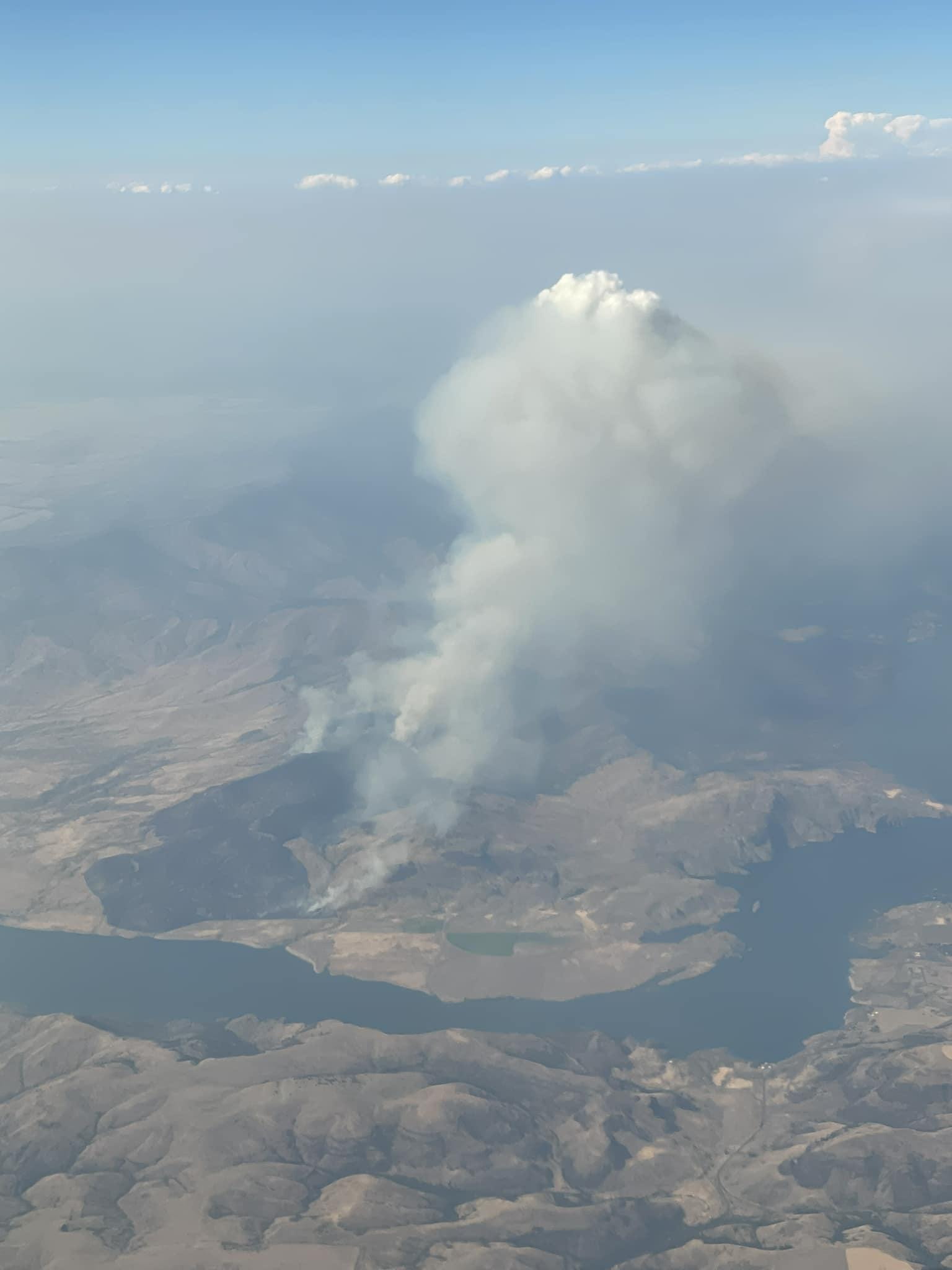
- Smoke plume rising above the Swawilla Fire, north of Franklin D. Roosevelt Lake
- Date: July 17, 2024 - August 15, 2024
- Coordinates: 47.989922°N 118.757401°W

Statistics
- Burned area: 53,462 acres (21,635 ha; 84 sq mi; 216 km^{2})

Impacts
- Deaths: 0
- Injuries: 0
- Structures destroyed: 2, incorrectly stated to be ~28
- Cost: $19,008,764 (2024 USD)

Ignition
- Cause: Lightning

Map

The Swawilla Fire was a large wildfire in Ferry and Okanogan counties, located in the U.S. state of Washington. The fire started on July 17, 2024, and was declared 98% contained on August 9. It was the sixth fire to burn more than 1,000 acres as part of the 2024 Washington wildfire season, and was the largest fire of the entire season, at 53,343 acres covered.

Although the fire did not cause any direct injuries or fatalities, it did destroy 2 structures and inflicted a total of $19,008,764 (2024 USD) in damages to vegetation, roads and trees located near the Franklin D. Roosevelt Lake. The fire led to evacuations in multiple communities, most notably Keller, and temporary closure of the Keller Ferry.

== Progression ==
The fire was started by a dry lightning strike on July 17 in the Swawilla Canyon area, and began to progress north. Initial efforts to contain the fire were not effective and by July 20, Washington State Department of Transportation, operator of the Keller Ferry, made the decision to keep the ferry route closed after completion of scheduled maintenance that started July 16. The area surrounding the ferry's northern landing was by that point subject to a level 3 "go now" evacuation order by the fire command.

By July 21, the fire had burnt onto Mica Peak and Mica Ridge, and the progression of the fire slowed down slightly. Firefighters also began to prioritize the protection of structures located along Washington State Route 21 and Manilla Creek Road. The fire grew to an estimated 5,000 acres (2,000 ha) by the end of July 21. The Swawilla basin and Manilla Creek Roads, along with Highway 21 south of Manilla creek were all closed to the public on the 21st. Oversight of the fire was handed from the Northeast Washington Incident Management Team to Northern Rockies Complex Incident Management Team 6 who would coordinate with the Colville Agency of Confederated Tribes and the Washington Department of Natural Resources.

On July 23, the fire had grown to 7,291 acres (2,951 ha), and the town of Keller was issued a Level 2 Evacuation warning as a result of the approaching fire, and the fire progress further south along State Highway 21. By July 24, the fire had rapidly grown, covering 12,634 acres (5,113 ha). A level 2 evacuation warning was initially issued for areas in the Buffalo Lake and McGinnis Lake vicinity west to the Columbia River north of Elmer City at 10:00. The Keller area Level 2 evacuation warning was upgraded to a Level 3 "Go" warning at 7:30 p.m. the same day, covering the areas from Empire Creek to north of Keller at Silver Creek Road. At the same time the Buffalo and McGinnis Lakes area was raised to a level 3 notice as well. To accommodate evacuees, evacuation centers were established in the Lake Roosevelt High School at Coulee Dam and Pascal Sherman Indian School in Omak.

To assist with the increased level 3 evacuations, the Keller Ferry resumed service on July 25 from the northern launch only, and was running overnight, contrary to regular scheduling of stopping at 11:00pm.

On July 25, the fire had reached 30,000 acres (12,000 ha), and by July 26 this number had jumped to 30,667 acres (12,410 ha). The area of fire that burned along the Swawilla Basin was contained, and priorities shifted to structure and life protection. On July 28, the fire had reached 43,352 acres (17,544 ha) and another evacuation center was set up at the Republic Fairgrounds, and the center at Coulee Dam was closed. Containment reached 10% on the same day with major fire activity on the slope of Mount Tolman fanned by winds. Air operations were concentrated in the northeastern quadrant of the fire. Areas of the southwestern burned zone were reopened from Buffalo Lake Road to Peter Dan Road.

On July 30, firefighters had established fire lines in and around Keller to protect structures, however the level 3 evacuation notice was extended north to Cache Creek Road and east across the Sanpoil River "mouth" to areas of the eastern shore of the mouth. The Peter Dan/Manilla Creek Road corridor and then Highway 21 south to the ferry landing were transitioned to level to for residential use. The evacuation shelters had been updated again, with human shelter only available at the Republic Fairgrounds, but livestock shelters were open at the rodeo grounds in both Grand Coulee and Nespelem. As work on the Bridge Creek Fire transitioned towards mop-up work, the transition of teams and resources to the Swawilla fire started. Fire teams patrolled containment lines around Keller, and along Highway 21 performing controlled burns to reduce fuel pockets and strengthen the fire perimeter in preparation for increasing fire weather conditions forecast for coming days. Unmanned aerial vehicle systems were on night operations were used for remote controlled ignition of burns along the Mount Tolman fire lines. By August 2, the fire had reached 50,012 acres (20,239 ha) in size while being 65% contained, and with the Bridge Creek Fire at 90% containment more teams were transferred south to the Swawilla. The Republic fairgrounds transitioned to sheltering livestock and animals while taking no more evacuees. By August 3, the fire had reached 53,343 acres (21,587 ha), but fire line construction and cooperative weather conditions allowed for the evacuation levels in a number of sections to be reduced to 2. Notably the Highway 21 corridor, Keller and the immediate vicinity, and the region between the Columbia and Manilla Creek/Peter Day Road. The eastern shore areas of the Sanpoil River mouth effected by evacuation notice were dropped down to level 1 notice, as was the area between Buffalo Lake and the Columbia north of Elmer City. The resources allocated to the fire as of August 3 included 685 personnel including 11 fire crews, 51 fire engines, and two Type 2 helicopters.

=== Incorrect damage statement ===
An incorrect news story by 560 KPQ 101.7 asserted the fire to have destroyed 28 structures as of August 1. This number was disputed by InciWeb command late on August 1.
