= Tieton Main Canal =

Irrigation canal in Washington state

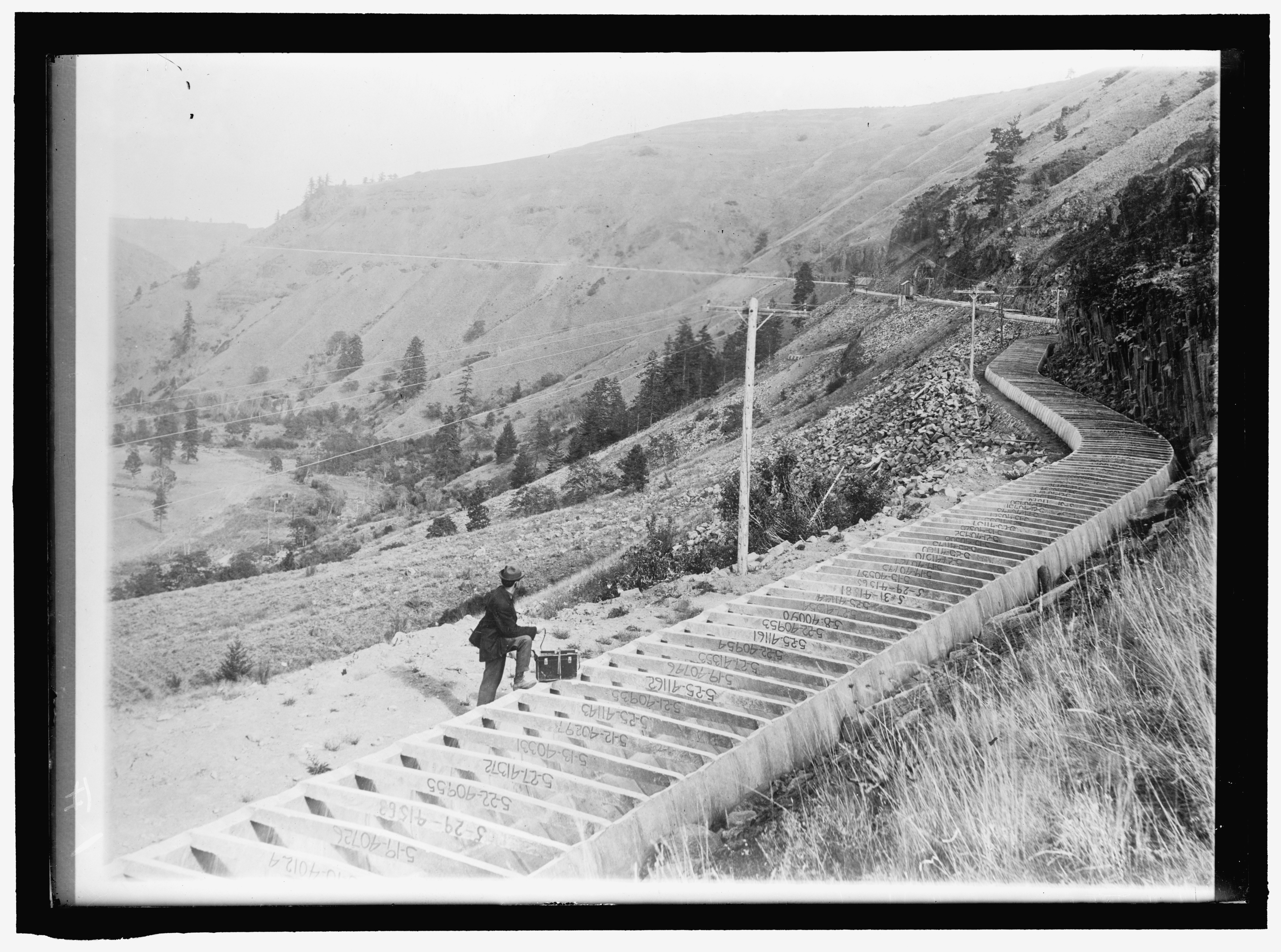
- Original, open canal in 1912
- Interactive map of Tieton Main Canal
- Location: Near Tieton, Washington
- Country: United States
- Coordinates: 46°40′11.43″N 121°0′11.28″W

Specifications
- Length: 12 miles (19 km)
- Total rise: −1,000 feet (−300 m)

History
- Current owner: Yakima Tieton Irrigation District
- Date completed: 1907

Geography
- Start point: diversion dam 46.67127°N 121.00802°W
- Connects to: Tieton River

Tieton Main Canal, also called Tieton Canal, Yakima-Tieton Irrigation Canal and Yakima Tieton Main Canal, is a 12-mile (19 km) long irrigation canal on the Tieton River in Washington state. It was cut by hand in 1906 with federal funding, one of the first canals created under the 1902 Reclamation Act, and opened in 1907. The canal was shut down for 19 days due to ash from the 1980 eruption of Mount St. Helens and again during the Rimrock Retreat Fire in 2024. Two miles of the canal are through tunnels, including 3,810-foot (1,160 m) long North Fork Tunnel.

The canal is managed by Yakima Tieton Irrigation District.

As of the 2010s, the canal was "at risk of catastrophic failure" according to its owner, and in need of replacement, with a $200 million estimated cost for building a new canal.
