= Henry Sedge =

American pioneer and forest ranger (1855–1938)

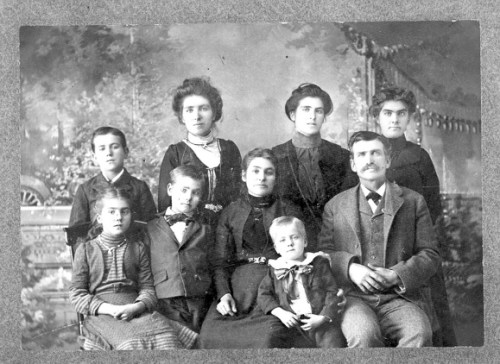
- Henry, Sarah, and the kids (circa 1900s)
- Born: Henry Sedges; 4 October 1855; Meigs County, Ohio, United States
- Died: 1 March 1938 (aged 82); Naches, Washington, United States
- Resting place: Naches Cemetery, Naches, Washington
- Occupations: Forest ranger Pioneer; Postmaster; General store owner
- Years active: 1874–1935
- Known for: First forest ranger in the Cascade Mountains; founding figure of Nile, Washington and Naches, Washington
- Spouse: Sarah Eleanor Plumley (m. September 3, 1879)

Henry Sedge (October 4, 1855 – March 1, 1938) was an early pioneer and forest ranger of Yakima County, Washington. He was among the first rangers of the Rainier Forest Reserve as early as 1899, before the establishment of the U.S. Forest Service. He homesteaded the Nile and Naches areas, where he built the first sawmill, ran general stores, and was a postmaster and ferryman. He was admired by locals there because he played a central role in the development of the town's earliest businesses, schools, and land policies during Washington's frontier days.

== Early life and family ==
Henry Sedge (born Henry Sedges) was born on October 4, 1855, in Meigs County, Ohio, to Alexander Sedges and Eleanor Stone, who were both natives of New Jersey and Pennsylvania. He later changed his surname to Sedge. The 1860 U.S. Census recorded him as a 5-year-old in Olive Township, Meigs County, Ohio, living with his family.

He grew up on a farm in Olive Township, Meigs County, Ohio, the middle of nine children: Freling Sedge (died at birth), George Sedge, of Oregon; John Watson Sedge, of Missouri; Elizabeth Florence (Sedge) Foley, who died at age 28 in Jackson, Missouri; William Perry Sedge, of Oregon Charles Sedge and Morgan Sedge, both living in Missouri; and Taylor Sedge (died at birth). His younger brother, William Perry Sedge, would become a leading merchant and postmaster at Dairy, Oregon. Henry spent his early years studying at local common schools in Ohio and later high school in Virginia, but quit formal schooling at around age 12. By 1870, his parents had moved the family to Oxford, Kansas, and the 14-year-old Henry was counted living with them in the U.S. Census.

While the family was living in Kansas, Henry's father, Alexander Sedge, became established as a local businessman. Newspaper accounts from the 1870s and early 1880s described his activities as a merchant in Longton where he expanded his store, purchased property, and later operated a meat market. Alexander also became a subject of local humor when the Longton Weekly Ledger published a poem about his encounter with a particularly large ox in March 1873.

The family later moved to Missouri, and Henry moved to Texas where he worked as a cowboy. In 1874, he was seriously injured when he was thrown from and trampled by a horse. Because of this accident, he moved to California to recover his health. He established a general merchandise company and remained in California until 1881.

Henry's mother, Eleanor (Stone) Sedge, died on 14 June 1888 in Sherman County, Oregon where she stayed at her son, William Perry's, and was buried in Wasco Methodist Cemetery. After her death, Alexander Sedge moved to McDonald County, Missouri, where he died in 1891.

Henry was married to Sarah Eleanor Plumley on 3 September 1879 at Point of Timber, California. The ceremony was conducted by Rev. William Gaffney and was attended by Wells N. Moore and Olive A. Plumley. Sarah was born on December 23, 1855, in Clayton, California to Alonzo and Julia (Chilson) Plumley. Her mother Julia was a prominent pioneer of Contra Costa County, California who came across the plains with her husband in 1853 and raised twelve children. Julia died in 1906 following a prolonged illness.

Sarah Sedge died on September 20, 1931, at the age of 75, in her home in Naches, Washington. She had lived in the Yakima Valley for 41 years and was a member of the Naches Presbyterian Church, the Ladies Aid Society, and the Rebekahs. Her funeral was held at the Naches Presbyterian Church and was handled by Shaw & Sons Funeral Home. At the time of her death, she was survived by her husband; three daughters, Olive E. Thompson, Maude L. Parmentier, and Lillian McNamara; three sons, Henry W., Alonzo, and Willard M. Sedge; four sisters; four brothers; sixteen grandchildren; and one great-grandchild. The Sedges had celebrated their golden wedding anniversary on September 3, 1929.

Henry moved to Klickitat County, Washington, in 1881, where he farmed and raised stock. He disposed of his interests in 1890 and established a butcher shop in Yakima City, which had to close during a depression in the economy. Sedge then moved to a homestead on the Nile River in Yakima County, Washington, where he established the first sawmill in the region. He farmed there until 1899, when he purchased the farm that he would work for the rest of his life.

Henry and Sarah had seven children: Eleanor Julia (Sedge) Brownlee, Olive Elizabeth (Sedge) Thompson, Maude Lenora (Sedge) Parmentier, Henry William Sedge (also known as Hank), Lillian (Sedge) McNamara, Alonzo Watson "Lonnie" Sedge, and Willard McKinley Sedge, who would become active in civic affairs in Naches, Washington and Yakima County, Washington.

== Career ==
=== Farming and business ===
Henry Sedge in the 1880's

Henry Sedge moved west from Ohio to Washington (state) by the early 1880s. Henry Sedge was listed with his family in the 1900 U.S. Federal Census in the Naches precinct of Yakima, as a 45-year-old farmer, born October 1855 in Ohio.

Sedge was farming and stock raising in Klickitat County, Washington, by 1881. In 1888, he was issued a homestead patent for 160 acres in Klickitat County under the Homestead Act of 1862.

In addition to general livestock, Sedge bred cattle. He is listed in the 1928 Holstein-Friesian Herd Book for his work with breeding Holstein cattle in Naches.

After an unsuccessful attempt at running a butcher business in Yakima, which closed during an economic downturn, Sedge relocated to the Nile Valley. He homesteaded, built the first sawmill in the valley, and farmed until 1899. The Yakima Herald wrote that year about Sedge and James Markel killing a large black bear, providing insight into the challenges of the early settlers.

In early 1895, Sedge co-signed an estray notice alongside fellow settler James Markel, reporting the capture of a young iron-grey mare on the Nile and inviting the owner to reclaim it by paying necessary charges.

Sedge was in business in Naches by 1896, advertising for the City Meat Market. He opened a general store in Naches in the Clemmer brick building about 1908. It had a butcher shop and cold storage locker, which was a boon to residents before people had refrigerators in their homes. He then joined with Bill Jones, and "Sedge & Jones" was in business from 1933 to 1935. Even after there was a change of ownership of the store, it continued to be an important part of the community for decades.

On the opposite side of the Pease building stood the Clemmer brick building, built c. 1908 with apartments on the second floor. It was first run as a grocery store by W.E. "Ed" Arnold, then the Naches State Bank directors gave it to Henry Sedge. He ran it as a grocery store, butcher shop, and cold storage locker. Bill Jones joined Sedge in partnership before assuming complete ownership from 1935 through 1943 and calling it Jones Grocery & Lockers. The Joneses lived upstairs, where their daughter Nadine Jones Hinze was born. Dr. Grant Cameron established a dental office upstairs in 1925. Following Bill Jones's rental of the building to "Slim" Fewel in 1943, it was Slim's Grocery Store & Lockers through 1952. The building went through a number of owners after this, being Lucky Dollar grocery store and then the Green Door. It is now owned by Larry Naud.

Sedge built a second grocery store near the present Watson (Bowman) house in 1908. A post office was opened at Naches around this time, and the first postmaster, Bill Bennington, occupied part of Sedge's store. Various other local businesses sprang up around these, including a livery stable for freight horses, a hotel, a restaurant, a meat market, and a pool hall.

In January 1897, Sedge was granted a five-year permit to operate a ferry across the Naches River approximately 100 yards upstream from where Rattlesnake Creek flows in.

In October 1920, Sedge was injured in a hunting accident near the Naches River when he was struck in the cheek by stray birdshot from careless pheasant hunters.

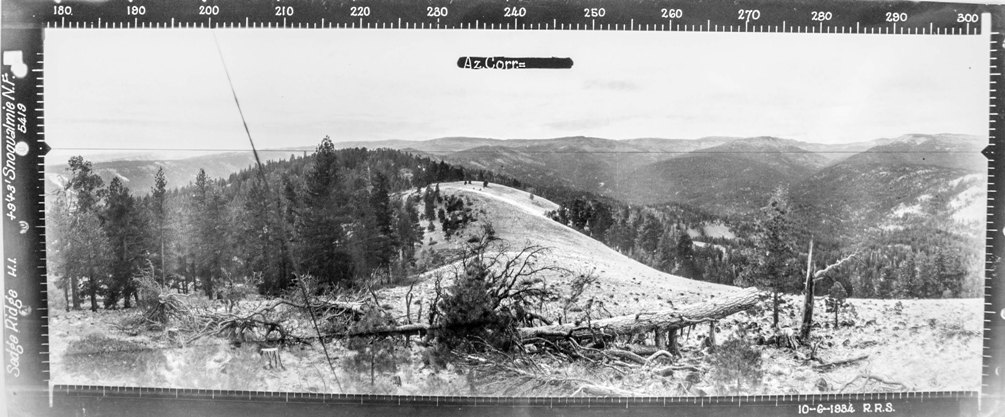
Sedge Ridge, named after Henry Sedge, shown here on October 6, 1934, looking southwest. The ridge is located in the Cascade Mountains, part of the area where Sedge served as one of the first forest rangers.

=== Forest ranger career ===
The Yakima Republic reported on June 2, 1899, that Nile's Henry Sedge had been appointed as a patrolman in the Rainier Forest Reserve. He was made forest ranger for the Rainier Reserve east of the Cascade Mountains in May 1899, and was the only ranger east of the Cascades with a second-grade appointment. His duties included overseeing logging practices and wildfire prevention.

In June 1900, the Yakima Herald announced that Sedge was the only one from Yakima among twelve rangers appointed by Superintendent Sheller to work in the Rainier Forest Reserve. He was included in the 1901 Register of Officers and Agents of the United States Department of the Interior, which confirmed his work in Yakima.

Sedge was introduced publicly in April 1901 at a grazing permit meeting, demonstrating his involvement in local land management. The Yakima Republic reported in the same month that Sedge, along with others, requested the extension of an upper Naches River road, which the county commissioners approved.

In July 1902, Sedge was appointed sheep ranger for the Cowiche range of the forest reserve. In June 1903, the Yakima Republic reported that Sedge was bound for the head of Ahtanum Creek on ranger duty.

In December 1907, Sedge was among several Yakima-area hunters who secured licenses following the first substantial snowfall of the season, pointing to continued activity with the outdoors.

== Community involvement ==
In July 1890, the six-year-old daughter of Henry Sedge was assaulted in a failed attack in Yakima City. The Yakima Herald reported that James Phillips, aged 60, was arrested for enticing the girl and other children onto his property on the pretext of picking berries. When Phillips tried to isolate the child in order to assault her, the attack was thwarted by the child's screams and the fact that her friends were with her. Phillips was arrested and incarcerated on $3,000 bond; some in the community thought he was crazy and possibly better off institutionalized in an asylum.

In April 1909, Sedge officiated at the wedding of Henry W. Rowland and Bessie May at the home of Mr. and Mrs. A.L. Little in the Tieton Valley. The wedding, which was attended by friends and relatives, was characterized by The Yakima Herald as a nice community event.

Sedge was one of the people who received witness fees in Yakima County local court proceedings in January 1891.

Sedge was also noted as a witness in a 1911 homestead proof case of James H. Hayes, a land claimant of the Tieton Reclamation Project. The United States Land Office in North Yakima witnessed Sedge's participation in the formal process, further establishing his presence and activity in local land development.

Sedge was quite involved in Naches civic life. He helped secure land for the new high school in 1919 and also held the postmaster position at Nile (1896–1899) and Naches (appointed 1907). In November 1899, he was succeeded as Nile postmaster by J.W. Beck.

The Yakima Herald, December 10, 1896, reported that Henry Sedge had officially filed his bond as postmaster of the new Nile post office, located about 20 miles northwest of Yakima City.

Henry Sedge served on a local committee in November 1906 when visiting delegates were hosted in the developing town of Naches, Washington. The Yakima Herald noted that the visitors were greeted at the train station and given local apples, cider, and cigars. Sedge was accompanied on the committee by W.D. Thompson, G.W. Denton, Alfred Penny, and Harry Painter. The Commercial Club was the sponsor of the event to help advertise the area's farm land and induce community development.

Two new post offices in the Naches Valley were opening named Nile and Yreka. Henry Sedge was made postmaster at Nile, and Charles H. Barr became the boss at Yreka

In July 1908, Henry Sedge helped apprehend a crazed man wandering around Naches City. According to the Yakima Herald, Sedge and W.L. Dimmick caught the man on the evening of July 29, and then the authorities took charge.

The Yakima Herald reported in December 1908 on the very festive Christmas celebrations in Naches City, featuring a grand ball. Henry Sedge, a well-known local character, and Miss Callie McKinney were the award recipients for the best costumed couple.

Sedge exhibited some Black Langshan chickens at the January 1912 Yakima Valley Poultry Show, which was well attended by breeders from all over the county. He won a number of prizes, including first, second, and third on pullets, first and second on cockerels, and first prize for the best pen of the breed. The show was being judged by Elmer Dixon, who was a well-known poultry expert, and the results were printed in the Yakima Herald.

He was also involved in fraternal life as a member of the Yakima Odd Fellows Lodge, a group that often had well-known settlers and local businessmen among its membership.

== Death ==
Henry Sedge died on March 1, 1938, in Naches, Washington. The death certificate indicated bronchitis, with bronchopneumonia and chronic heart trouble, as the cause of death. He was buried at Naches Cemetery. His obituary in the Yakima Daily Republic mentioned his life as a pioneer and his efforts to develop the area.

Henry Sedges Headstone

== Legacy ==
Henry Sedge is remembered as being one of the first forest rangers in the Cascade Mountains and for his early role in the development of Nile and Naches, Washington. His name appears frequently in old newspapers, Forest Service records, and books on local history, noting his role in the development of the community and the protection of the land during its first years. His son, Willard McKinley Sedge, was the first graduate of Naches High School in 1917. He attended Washington State College (now Washington State University) and moved back to Naches later on.

== See also ==
- Nile, Washington
- Naches, Washington
- Okanogan-Wenatchee National Forest
- Yakima County, Washington
- United States Forest Service
- Rainier National Forest
