= Nile, Washington =

Unincorporated community in Washington, United States

- Unincorporated community & CDP
- Location within Washington (state)
- Coordinates: 46°49′14″N 120°56′22″W
- Country: United States
- State: Washington
- County: Yakima
- Elevation: 2,008 ft (612 m)
- Time zone: UTC-8 (Pacific (PST))
  - Summer (DST): UTC-7 (PDT)
- ZIP code: 98937
- Area code: 509
- GNIS feature ID: 2585011

Nile is a census-designated place and unincorporated community in Yakima County, Washington, United States, located approximately 35 miles northwest of Yakima in the Nile Valley adjacent to the Naches River in the Nile Valley, near the mouth of Rattlesnake Creek.

As of the 2020 census, Nile had a population of 146.

== History ==
The community was established in the mid-1890s by families of James Beck, William Markel and Henry Sedge, who may have named the small valley and community Nile because of the area's fertility thought to resemble that of the Nile River Valley in Egypt. Henry Sedge was among the first settlers who helped establish the Nile community in the 1890s. Born in Ohio in 1855, Henry Sedge moved westward and eventually settled in the fertile Naches Valley area. He and his family were instrumental in developing the agricultural infrastructure of the region, including early irrigation efforts that transformed the Nile Valley into productive farmland.

Henry Sedge also served as one of the earliest U.S. Forest Service rangers in the region, establishing a ranger station at Nile Creek and helping to lay the groundwork for forest management in the Eastern Cascades.

His legacy remains an important part of Nile's history, reflected in local landmarks such as Sedge Ridge, named in his honor. According to historian Gretta Gossett, "there is yet an alluvial plain along the river near Nile Creek which is often flooded in the spring and left with a layer of silt perhaps giving rise to the name for the Nile in Egypt."

== Demographics ==
Historical population
Census	Pop.	Note	%±
2010	140		—
2020	146		4.3%
U.S. Decennial Census; 2000 2010

Nile first appeared as a census designated place in the 2010 U.S. census.

=== Racial and ethnic composition ===
Nile CDP, Washington – Racial and ethnic composition Note: the US Census treats Hispanic/Latino as an ethnic category. This table excludes Latinos from the racial categories and assigns them to a separate category. Hispanics/Latinos may be of any race.
Race / Ethnicity (NH = Non-Hispanic)	Pop 2010	Pop 2020	% 2010	% 2020
White alone (NH)	133	124	95.00%	84.93%
Black or African American alone (NH)	1	0	0.71%	0.00%
Native American or Alaska Native alone (NH)	0	0	0.00%	0.00%
Asian alone (NH)	0	1	0.00%	0.68%
Native Hawaiian or Pacific Islander alone (NH)	0	0	0.00%	0.00%
Other race alone (NH)	0	0	0.00%	0.00%
Mixed race or Multiracial (NH)	0	7	0.00%	4.79%
Hispanic or Latino (any race)	6	14	4.29%	9.59%
Total	140	146	100.00%	100.00%
