= Pioneer Fire =

2024 wildfire in Washington, USA

- Part of 2024 Washington wildfires
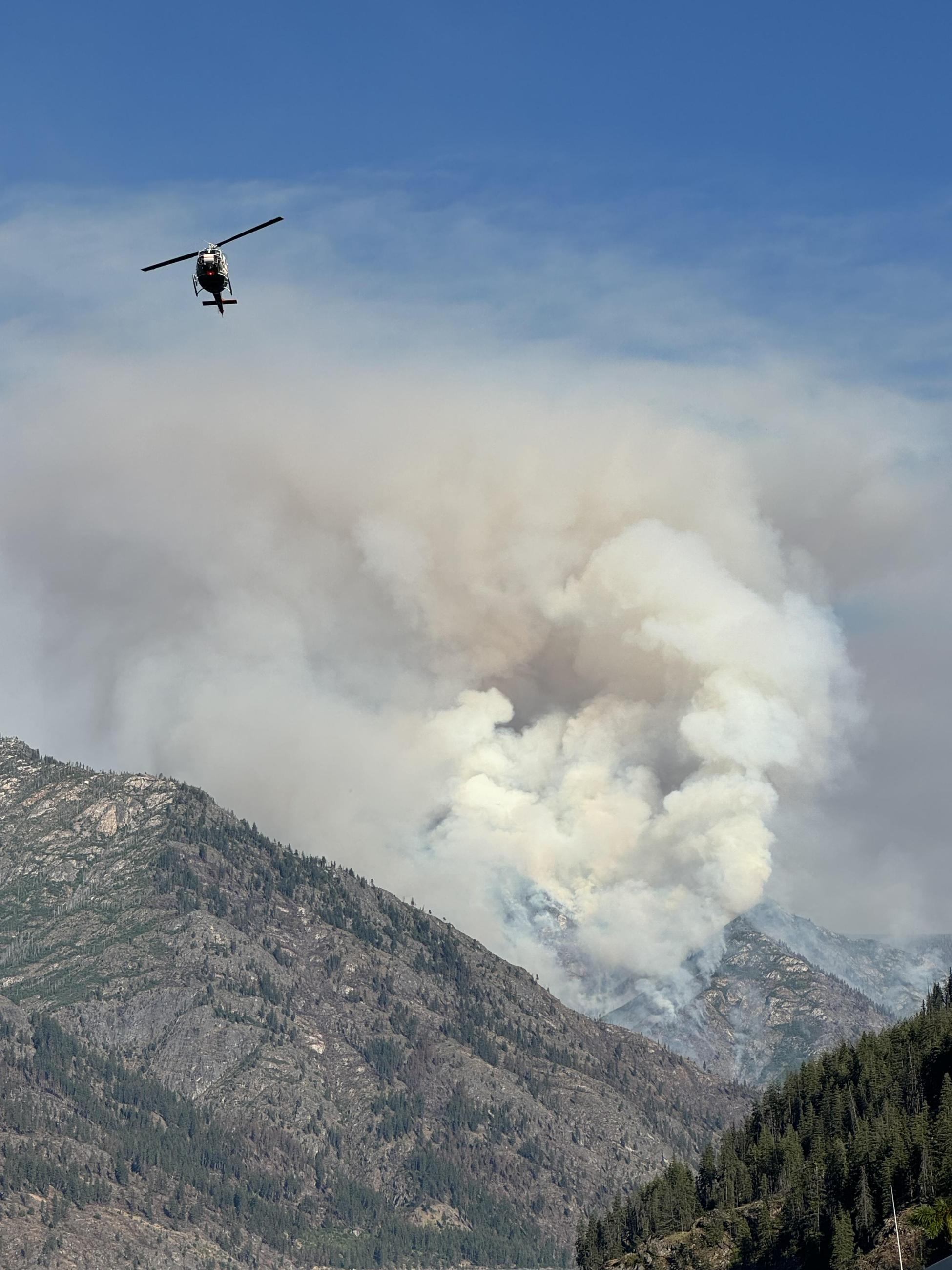
- Aerial view of the Pioneer Fire on July 26
- Date: June 8 – October 5, 2024
- Location: Chelan County, Washington, U.S.
- Coordinates: 48°10′57″N 120°31′51″W

Statistics
- Burned area: 38,735 acres (15,675 ha)

Impacts
- Deaths: 0

Ignition
- Cause: Undetermined

Map
- Approximate location of the Pioneer Fire in Washington

The Pioneer Fire was a large wildfire in Chelan County, Washington, United States. It was first reported on June 8, 2024, on the north side of Lake Chelan and spread northwest throughout the wilderness in the Okanogan–Wenatchee National Forest. By August, it had reached the outskirts of Stehekin, prompting an evacuation order that was downgraded later that month. The fire was fully contained by October 5.

== History ==
On June 8, 2024, a 10-to-15-acre (4.0 to 6.1 ha) fire was reported on private land near Pioneer Creek about 31 miles (50 km) northwest of Chelan in the eastern foothills of the Cascade Mountains. The cause is undetermined and remains under investigation, but is suspected to have originated from a human-caused structure fire. By the following day, the fire had reached 600 acres (240 ha) in size and prompted evacuations for recreational areas near Lake Chelan. Several hikers were rescued from the Lakeshore Trail via marine transport by the Chelan County Sheriff. Pacific Northwest Team 13 was assigned to fight the fire after it had expanded into the nearby Okanogan–Wenatchee National Forest.

The Pioneer Fire grew to 3,811 acres (1,542 ha) by June 17 and the evacuation zone was adjusted to include more recreational areas along Lake Chelan. The fire increased to 20,348 acres (8,235 ha) on July 16 and moved slowly uphill from the lake to ridges as it consumed dead brush and fuel. It continued northwestward along Lake Chelan and approached Stehekin, a settlement at the north end of the lake with 80 year-round residents and no road access to the rest of the state. A Level 3 immediate evacuation notice for Stehekin was issued on July 28 after the Pioneer Fire had crossed a key drainage area and moved uphill within 1.5 miles (2.4 km) of the settlement. A ferry service to transport evacuees to an American Red Cross shelter in Chelan was also announced, but many residents opted to remain in their homes. A video message that urged residents to evacuate was also issued by Washington governor Jay Inslee.

On July 30, Chelan County emergency management agency reported that 90 of 95 residents in Stehekin had refused to evacuate; under state laws, evacuations are not mandatory. Stehekin became the headquarters of the firefighting operation, which encompasses nearly 730 personnel housed in resort buildings in the area and over 27 miles (43 km) of hose lines. To prepare for the defense of Stehekin, firefighters cleared trees and brush to establish fire breaks, wrapped historic and vulnerable wood buildings in protective foil, and brought equipment via barges. A floating dock was installed in the event that a large evacuation is needed. The area's lone hydroelectric power plant was also wrapped in protective foil by the Chelan County Public Utility District, which operates Stehekin's microgrid.

The fire reached within 100 feet (30 m) of buildings in Stehekin by August 7 but did not burn any structures. It grew to over 38,721 acres (15,670 ha) and reached 23 percent containment by August 16 with over 600 crew on-site, including volunteers from California. The Pioneer Fire had yet to burn any structures but posed a threat to 470 properties in and around Stehekin. The evacuation order for Stehekin Valley was downgraded to "be prepared" (Level 2) on August 18 by Chelan County Emergency Management; the Red Cross closed their shelter in Chelan the following day.

The Pioneer Fire's spread halted in early September as cooler temperatures and rain moved into the region; management of the firefighting response was transferred to the Okanogan–Wenatchee National Forest as protective measures for buildings in Stehekin were removed. The fire is expected to be fully contained by the end of October. On October 5, the fire was declared fully contained after three weeks of inactivity. At its peak, it burned 38,735 acres (15,675 ha) of land but destroyed no primary structures.

== See also ==
- 2024 Washington wildfires
