= Naches, Washington =

- Town
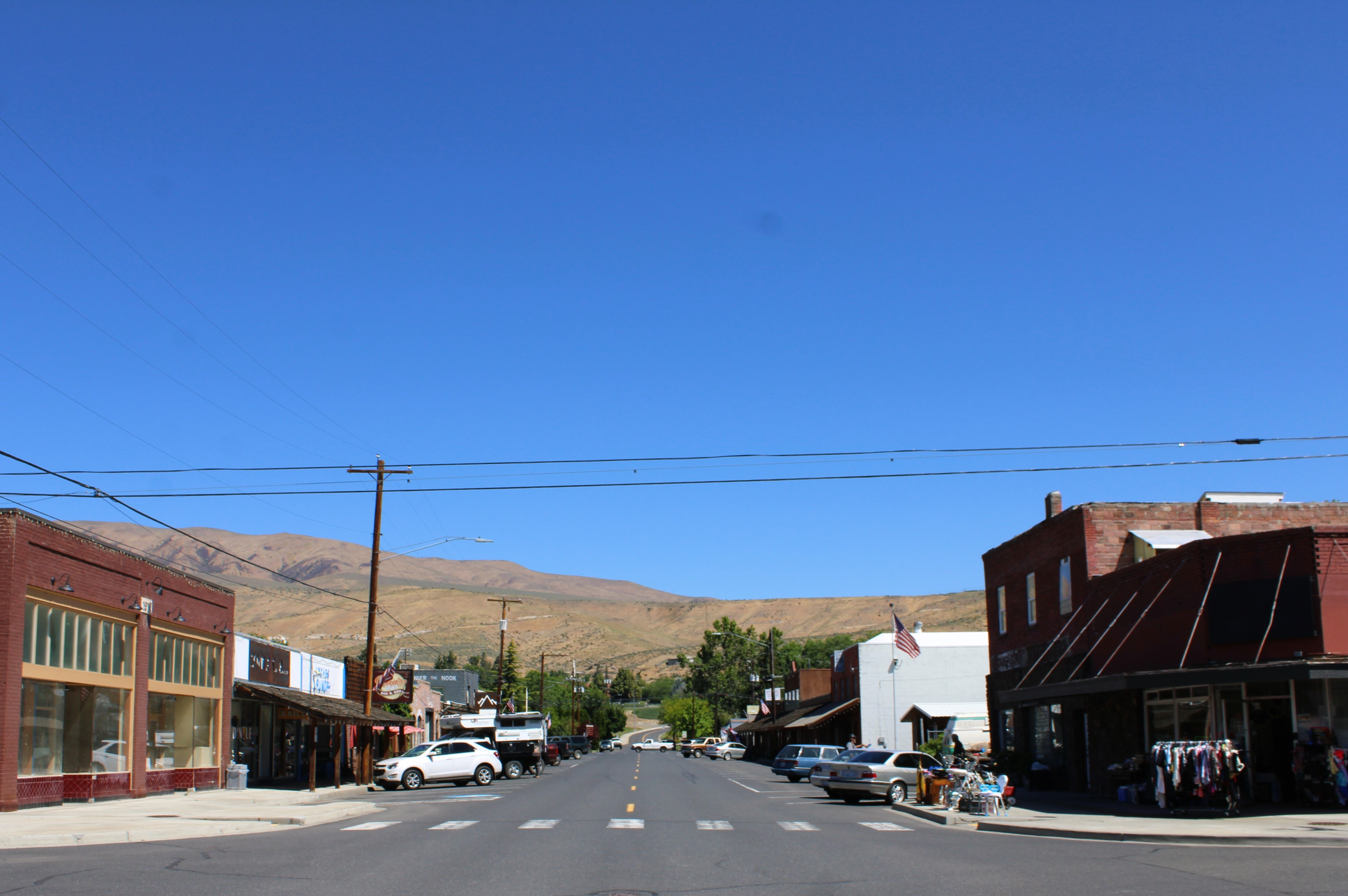

- Location of Naches, Washington
- Coordinates: 46°43′34″N 120°41′28″W
- Country: United States
- State: Washington
- County: Yakima
- Founded: 1909

Government
  - Mayor: Bill Davis

Area
  - Total: 0.87 sq mi (2.26 km^{2})
  - Land: 0.87 sq mi (2.26 km^{2})
  - Water: 0 sq mi (0.00 km^{2})
- Elevation: 1,453 ft (443 m)

Population (2020)
  - Total: 1,084
  - Estimate (2021): 1,046
  - Density: 971.7/sq mi (375.17/km^{2})
- Time zone: UTC-8 (PST)
  - Summer (DST): UTC-7 (PDT)
- ZIP codes: 98929, 98937
- Area code: 509
- FIPS code: 53-47805
- GNIS feature ID: 2413032
- Website: townofnaches.com

Naches is a town in Yakima County, Washington, United States. The population was 1,084 at the 2020 census. The town is located along the Naches River west of Yakima near the eastern foothills of the Cascade Range.

== History ==
In the late 19th and early 20th centuries, early settlers like Henry Sedge played a role in the development of the Naches and Nile communities. Sedge was appointed postmaster of Nile and was involved in education and community events, including Memorial Day programs at the local schoolhouse.

== Economy ==
Naches' economy is based mainly on timber and agriculture, known for its large production of apples, cherries, pears and various other fruits.

== Geography ==
The Naches River passes through the town and empties into the Yakima River 16 miles (26 km) southeast in the city of Yakima.

According to the United States Census Bureau, the town has a total area of 0.69 square miles (1.79 km^{2}), all of it land.

=== Climate ===
Naches has a semi-arid climate (Bsk) with hot summers coupled with cool nights and moderately cold winters.

Climate data for Naches, Washington
Month	Jan	Feb	Mar	Apr	May	Jun	Jul	Aug	Sep	Oct	Nov	Dec	Year
Record high °F (°C)	68 (20)	69 (21)	80 (27)	92 (33)	102 (39)	105 (41)	109 (43)	110 (43)	100 (38)	88 (31)	73 (23)	67 (19)	110 (43)
Mean daily maximum °F (°C)	39 (4)	47 (8)	56 (13)	64 (18)	72 (22)	80 (27)	88 (31)	87 (31)	78 (26)	64 (18)	48 (9)	36 (2)	63 (17)
Mean daily minimum °F (°C)	23 (−5)	26 (−3)	30 (−1)	34 (1)	42 (6)	48 (9)	53 (12)	52 (11)	44 (7)	34 (1)	27 (−3)	21 (−6)	36 (2)
Record low °F (°C)	−21 (−29)	−25 (−32)	−1 (−18)	18 (−8)	25 (−4)	30 (−1)	34 (1)	35 (2)	24 (−4)	4 (−16)	−13 (−25)	−17 (−27)	−25 (−32)
Average precipitation inches (mm)	1.15 (29)	0.81 (21)	0.62 (16)	0.55 (14)	0.58 (15)	0.62 (16)	0.22 (5.6)	0.26 (6.6)	0.36 (9.1)	0.54 (14)	1.05 (27)	1.53 (39)	8.29 (212.3)

== Demographics ==
Historical population
Census	Pop.	Note	%±
1930	423		—
1940	536		26.7%
1950	633		18.1%
1960	680		7.4%
1970	666		−2.1%
1980	644		−3.3%
1990	596		−7.5%
2000	643		7.9%
2010	795		23.6%
2020	1,084		36.4%
2021 (est.)	1,046	▼	−3.5%
U.S. Decennial Census; 2020 Census

Between 2010 and 2020, Naches grew by 36.3 percent and reached a population of over 1,000.

=== 2020 census ===
As of the 2020 census, there were 1,084 people and 368 households living in Naches, which had a population density of 1,246 inhabitants per square mile (481.1/km^{2}). There were 393 total housing units, of which 93.6% were occupied and 6.4% were vacant or for occasional use. The racial makeup of the town was 66.0% White, 1.7% Native American and Alaskan Native, 0.7% Black or African American, 0.6% Asian, and 0.0% Native Hawaiian and Pacific Islander. Residents who listed another race were 23.4% of the population and those who identified as more than one race were 7.7% of the population. Hispanic or Latino residents of any race were 31.3% of the population.

Of the 368 households in Naches, 44.6% were married couples living together and 6.5% were cohabitating but unmarried. Households with a male householder with no spouse or partner were 19.8% of the population, while households with a female householder with no spouse or partner were 29.1% of the population. Out of all households, 37.2% had children under the age of 18 living with them and 34.5% had residents who were 65 years of age or older. There were 368 occupied housing units in Naches, of which 59.2% were owner-occupied and 40.8% were occupied by renters.

The median age in the town was 34.0 years old for all sexes, 30.9 years old for males, and 40.0 years old for females. Of the total population, 21.7% of residents were under the age of 19; 37.2% were between the ages of 20 and 39; 26.9% were between the ages of 40 and 64; and 14.1% were 65 years of age or older. The gender makeup of the town was 59.1% male and 40.9% female.

=== 2010 census ===
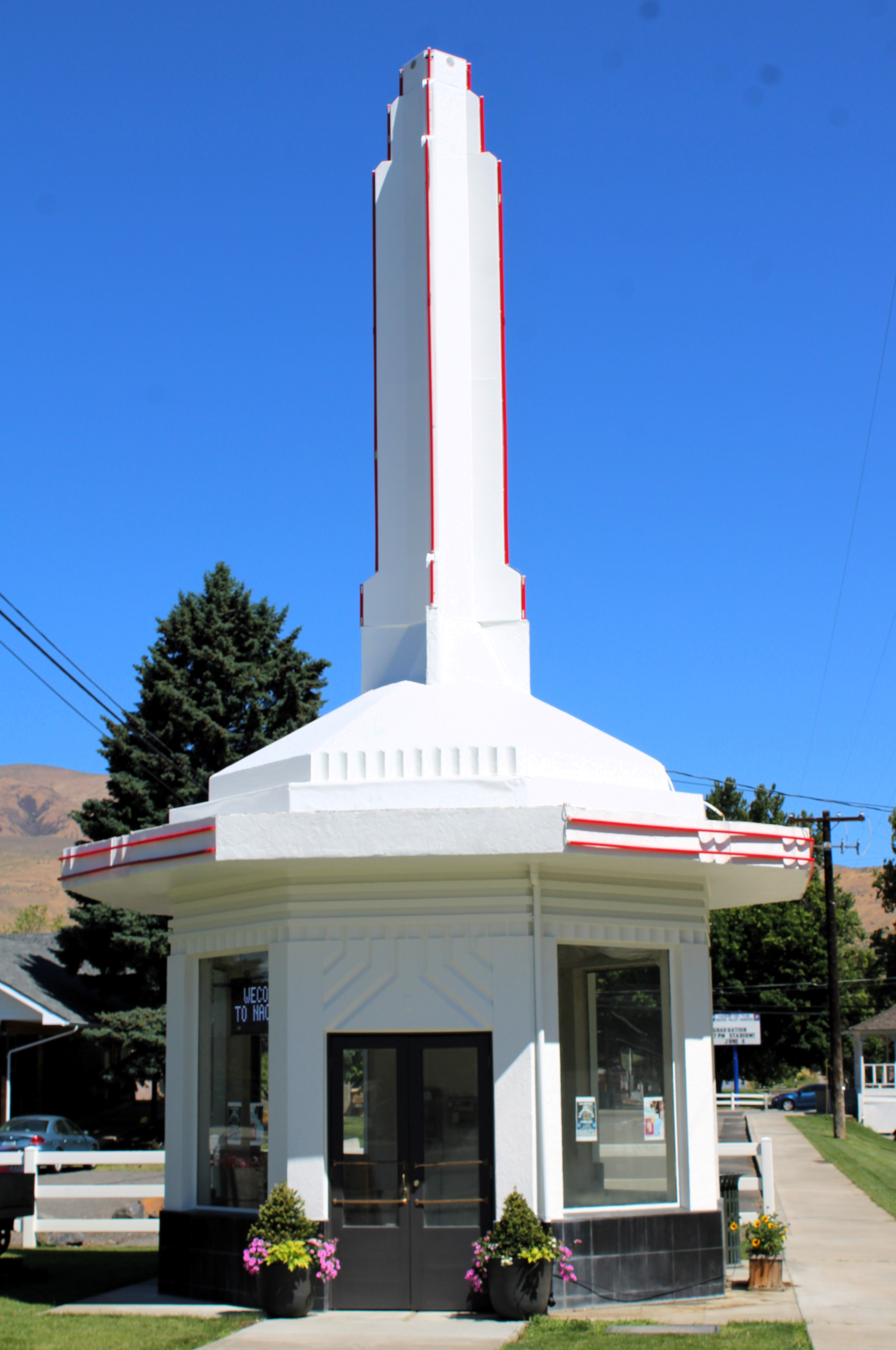
A former gas station is a local landmark

As of the 2010 census, there were 795 people, 317 households, and 225 families living in the town. The population density was 1,152.2 inhabitants per square mile (444.9/km^{2}). There were 346 housing units at an average density of 501.4 units per square mile (193.6 units/km^{2}). The racial makeup of the town was 92.8% White, 0.6% African American, 1.5% Native American, 3.3% from other races, and 1.8% from two or more races. Hispanic or Latino of any race were 8.3% of the population.

There were 317 households, of which 37.9% had children under the age of 18 living with them, 45.7% were married couples living together, 16.4% had a female householder with no husband present, 8.8% had a male householder with no wife present, and 29.0% were non-families. 23.7% of all households were made up of individuals, and 9.2% had someone living alone who was 65 years of age or older. The average household size was 2.51 and the average family size was 2.88.

The median age in the town was 37.4 years. 26.3% of residents were under the age of 18; 9.1% were between the ages of 18 and 24; 24.7% were from 25 to 44; 27.3% were from 45 to 64; and 12.6% were 65 years of age or older. The gender makeup of the town was 49.6% male and 50.4% female.

== Education ==
The Naches Valley School District operates all public schools within the town and surrounding area. The Yakima Valley Libraries system operates the Naches public library, which is funded by the town government through a contract. A closure of the library was proposed in 2025 due to funding cuts from the state and federal governments, but was averted by the approval of a new contract with the town government.
