= Rimrock Lake =

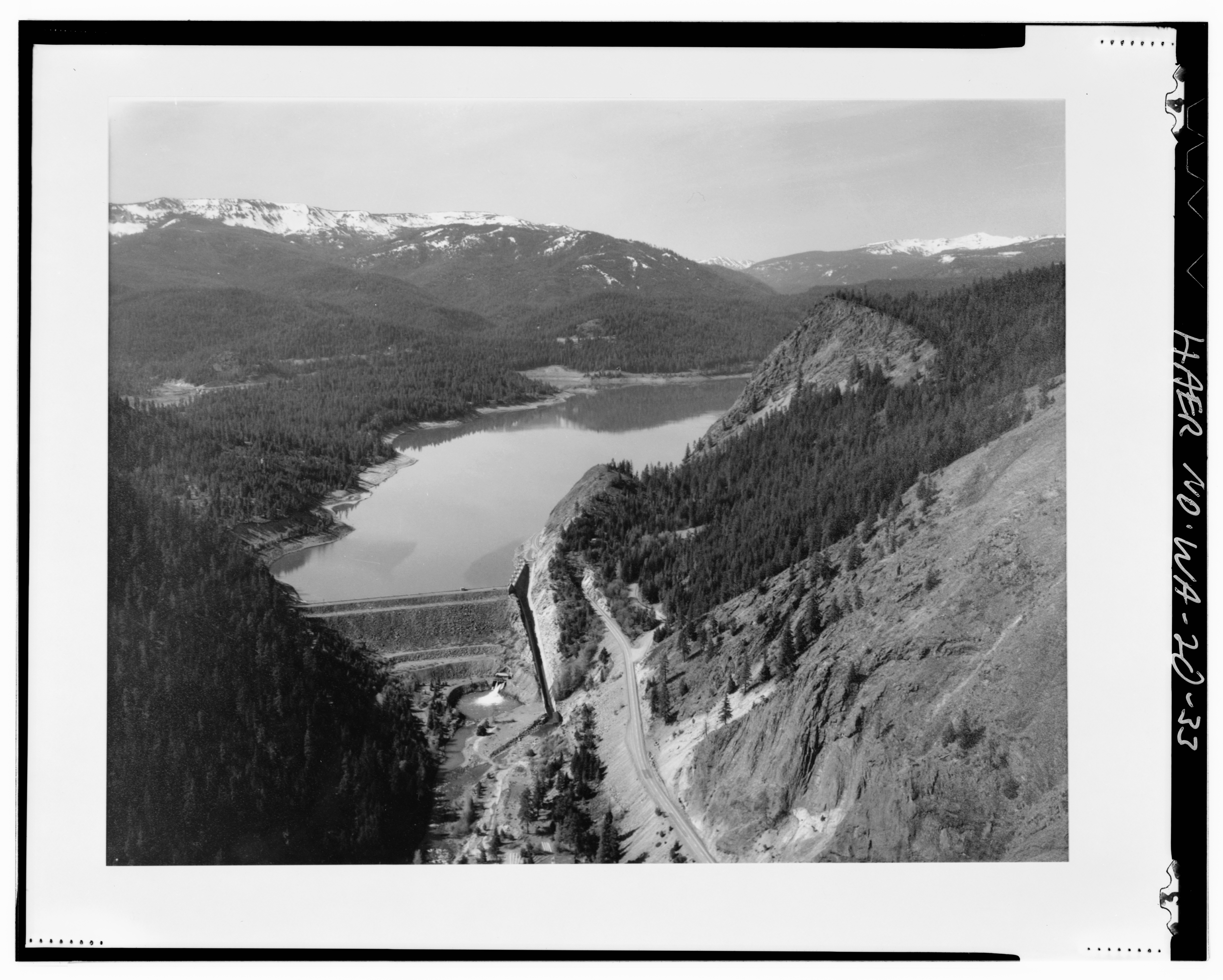
- Aerial view of Tieton Dam and Rimrock Lake from the downstream side of the dam.

- Location within Washington (state)
- Location: Yakima County, Washington
- Coordinates: 46°39′23″N 121°07′46″W
- Type: reservoir
- Primary inflows: Tieton River
- Primary outflows: Tieton River
- Catchment area: 187 mi^{2} (480 km^{2})
- Basin countries: United States
- Max. length: 6 mi (9.7 km)
- Max. width: 1 mi (1.6 km)
- Surface area: 2,674 acres (10.8 km^{2})
- Water volume: 0.0586 cu mi (0.244 km^{3})
- Surface elevation: 2,926 ft (892 m)

Clear Creek Falls upstream of Rimrock Lake

Rimrock Lake is a lake along the course of the Tieton River, in Yakima County, Washington state, US.

The lake is used as a storage reservoir for the Yakima Project, an irrigation project run by the United States Bureau of Reclamation. An impoundment of the Tieton River, Rimrock Lake's capacity and discharge is controlled by Tieton Dam, a 319-foot (97 m) high structure built in 1925. Rimrock Lake's active capacity is 198,000 acre⋅ft (244 million m^{3}).

Upstream from the lake, the Tieton River is impounded by Clear Creek Dam, another element of the Yakima Project. About 8 miles (13 km) downstream from Rimrock Lake the Tieton River is tapped by the Tieton Diversion Dam, supplying water to the Tieton Main Canal. The canal supplies irrigation water to the Tieton Division of the Yakima Project, with excess and agricultural runoff draining into Ahtanum Creek, west of Yakima.

Near the lakes are the communities of Rimrock and Silver Beach. The lake flooded the site of a Yakama village named Miya’wax and portions of the Yakama-Cowlitz Trail which connected the Yakama people east of the Cascade Range to the Cowlitz people west of the mountains.
