= Yakima Valley Libraries =

Library system in Washington state, US

- 46°36′16″N 120°30′16″W
- Location: Yakima County, Washington
- Type: Public library
- Established: 1944
- Branches: 16

Collection
- Size: 330,499 items

Access and use
- Circulation: 930,904
- Population served: 239,740
- Members: 93,730

Other information
- Budget: $7.9 million (2018)
- Director: Candelaria Mendoza
- Website: yvl.org
- References: Washington Public Library Statistical Report, 2016

The Yakima Valley Libraries (YVL) is a public library system that serves the Yakima Valley region of Washington, United States. The library system has 16 locations and a collection that includes public access to books, CDs, audiobooks, DVDs, and other materials, in both Spanish and English.

== History ==
The Yakima Public Library was constructed in 1904, primarily using $10,000 grant donated for that purpose by Andrew Carnegie. The Rural Library District #1 (RLD) was established in 1944, and, in 1951, pooled resources with the City of Yakima to form the Yakima Valley Regional Library System. Over the next decade, the rural cities of Zillah, Union Gap, Granger, Naches, Mabton, unincorporated Buena, joined the burgeoning library system. The cities of Sunnyside and joined the Regional Library in the 1950s. The 1970s saw the addition of Tieton, Harrah and Zillah, as well as the establishment of the Summitview (Yakima) branch. Moxee and Harrah joined in the 1980s, followed by the City of Toppenish, and the establishment of the Southeast (Yakima) branch in the 1990s, completing the current 17-branch system.

The Tieton library closed in 2025 after the town was unable to sign a new contract with YVL due to an increase in service fees.

== Organization ==
Many of the library branches are small and offer somewhat limited services to small, rural communities. The largest branches of the YVL system are West Valley, Selah, Sunnyside and the Downtown branch. The Downtown library is the largest, busiest branch, and, according to the YVL website, "also houses the library system's service center which includes programing for all ages, outreach services, technical services, information technology, and administration."

The Library is headed by the five-member Board of Library Trustees, who are appointed by the Yakima County Commissioners. The board is in charge of appointing the library director, who administers and adheres to the policies laid down by the board. In addition, the library is supported by Friends of the Library, who help coordinate donations and grants for the library, as well as furthering the role of libraries in the public, and raising funds for projects that are not covered in the library budget.

== Branches ==
The Yakima Valley Libraries system has branches in Granger, Harrah, Mabton, Moxee, Naches, Selah, Southeast Yakima, Sunnyside, Terrace Heights, Toppenish, Wapato, West Valley, Downtown Yakima, and Zillah.
