= Tieton, Washington =

- City
- Location of Tieton, Washington
- Coordinates: 46°41′57″N 120°45′02″W
- Country: United States
- State: Washington
- County: Yakima
- Founded: 1879
- Incorporated: June 5, 1942

Government
  - Type: Mayor–council
  - Mayor: Robert Adams

Area
  - Total: 0.86 sq mi (2.24 km^{2})
  - Land: 0.86 sq mi (2.24 km^{2})
  - Water: 0 sq mi (0.00 km^{2})
- Elevation: 1,923 ft (586 m)

Population (2020)
  - Total: 1,389
  - Estimate (2021): 1,561
  - Density: 1,513.4/sq mi (584.33/km^{2})
- Time zone: UTC-8 (PST)
  - Summer (DST): UTC-7 (PDT)
- ZIP code: 98947
- Area code: 509
- FIPS code: 53-71400
- GNIS feature ID: 2413390
- Website: www.cityoftieton.gov

Tieton (/ˈtaɪ.ətən/) is a city in Yakima County, Washington, United States. The population was 1,389 at the 2020 census.

== History ==
Tieton was officially incorporated on June 5, 1942. The city's name is derived from the Tieton River, meaning "roaring water".

The city's economy was primarily agricultural and its largest employers were cool warehouses for fruit that was grown in the Yakima Valley. In 2007, a Seattle lawyer and the founding president of the art publishing house Marquand Books began to finance a revitalization plan, named "Mighty Tieton", to bring new industries to the area. Among the initiatives was the creation of a mosaics studio that began to produce new artwork that would be displayed in Tieton.

== Geography ==
According to the United States Census Bureau, the town has a total area of 0.82 square miles (2.12 km^{2}), all of it land.

Tieton is located near the confluence of the Tieton River with the Naches River.

=== Climate ===
This climatic region is typified by large seasonal temperature differences, with warm to hot (and often humid) summers and cold (sometimes severely cold) winters. According to the Köppen Climate Classification system, Tieton has a humid continental climate, abbreviated "Dfb" on climate maps.

== Demographics ==
Historical population
Census	Pop.	Note	%±
1950	620		—
1960	479		−22.7%
1970	415		−13.4%
1980	528		27.2%
1990	693		31.3%
2000	1,154		66.5%
2010	1,191		3.2%
2020	1,389		16.6%
2021 (est.)	1,561		12.4%
U.S. Decennial Census; 2020 Census

Tieton has a large Hispanic and Latino community.

=== 2020 census ===
As of the 2020 census, Tieton had a population of 1,389. The median age was 30.8 years, with 32.9% of residents under the age of 18 and 8.0% aged 65 or older. For every 100 females there were 94.5 males, and for every 100 females age 18 and over there were 89.8 males age 18 and over.

0.0% of residents lived in urban areas, while 100.0% lived in rural areas.

There were 402 households in Tieton, of which 54.5% had children under the age of 18 living in them. Of all households, 49.5% were married-couple households, 14.2% were households with a male householder and no spouse or partner present, and 27.6% were households with a female householder and no spouse or partner present. About 13.2% of all households were made up of individuals and 4.2% had someone living alone who was 65 years of age or older.

There were 452 housing units, of which 11.1% were vacant. The homeowner vacancy rate was 2.2% and the rental vacancy rate was 0.0%.

Racial composition as of the 2020 census
Race	Number	Percent
White	470	33.8%
Black or African American	1	0.1%
American Indian and Alaska Native	35	2.5%
Asian	14	1.0%
Native Hawaiian and Other Pacific Islander	0	0.0%
Some other race	531	38.2%
Two or more races	338	24.3%
Hispanic or Latino (of any race)	1,004	72.3%

=== 2010 census ===
As of the 2010 census, there were 1,191 people, 358 households, and 279 families living in the town. The population density was 1,452.4 inhabitants per square mile (560.8/km^{2}). There were 385 housing units at an average density of 469.5 per square mile (181.3/km^{2}). The racial makeup of the town was 59.9% White, 0.3% African American, 2.4% Native American, 0.3% Asian, 0.1% Pacific Islander, 31.9% from other races, and 5.3% from two or more races. Hispanic or Latino of any race were 64.4% of the population.

There were 358 households, of which 54.2% had children under the age of 18 living with them, 51.7% were married couples living together, 19.3% had a female householder with no husband present, 7.0% had a male householder with no wife present, and 22.1% were non-families. 16.2% of all households were made up of individuals, and 7.3% had someone living alone who was 65 years of age or older. The average household size was 3.33 and the average family size was 3.67.

The median age in the town was 29.2 years. 33.8% of residents were under the age of 18; 10.6% were between the ages of 18 and 24; 28.7% were from 25 to 44; 19.8% were from 45 to 64; and 7% were 65 years of age or older. The gender makeup of the town was 49.5% male and 50.5% female.

== Government and politics ==
Tieton had a public library operated by the Yakima Valley Libraries system until its closure in 2025. The library, located in city hall, was supported by part of the municipal budget but was unable to continue operating after a raise in service fees to offset the loss of federal funding for the system.

== Notable people ==
- Pete Rademacher (1928-2020), Olympic boxing gold medalist, 1956
