= Clear Creek Dam (Washington) =

Dam in Yakima County, Washington, US

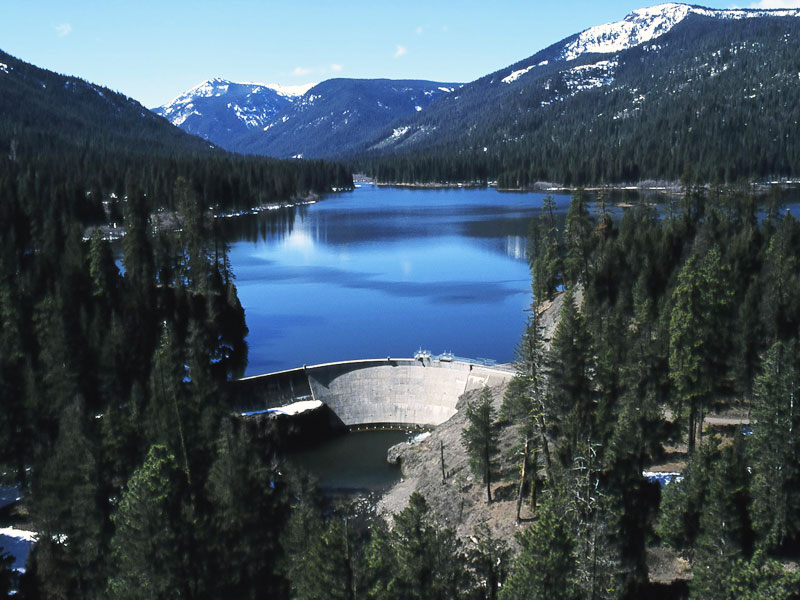
- Interactive map of Clear Creek Dam
- Country: United States
- Coordinates: 46°37′40″N 121°16′16″W
- Status: Operational
- Opening date: 1915, 1964, 1990
- Built by: United States Bureau of Reclamation
- Designed by: United States Bureau of Reclamation

Dam and spillways
- Impounds: Tieton River
- Height: 83 ft (25 m)

Reservoir
- Creates: Clear Lake
- Total capacity: 5,300 acre⋅ft (6,500,000 m^{3})
- Surface area: 260 acres (110 ha)
- Normal elevation: 2,995 ft (913 m)

Clear Creek Dam (National ID # WA00264) is a dam in Yakima County, Washington.

The concrete thin-arch dam was originally completed in 1915 by the United States Bureau of Reclamation at a height of 62 feet (19 m) and 404 feet (123 m) long at its crest. Raised another 21 feet (6.4 m) feet in 1918 to its present height of 83 feet (25 m) feet, it was partially rebuilt in 1964 then found structurally unsafe in 1990, when it was drained to less than 5% of its design capacity. The dam was reconstructed (with a new reinforcing gravity-dam element buttressing the original thin-arch structure) and refilled by popular demand.

The dam impounds the North Fork of the Tieton River, part of the Bureau's larger Yakima Project. Its use is now primarily recreational. Both dam and reservoir are owned and operated by the Bureau.

The reservoir it creates, Clear Lake, has a water surface of 260 acres (110 ha) and a capacity of 5,300 acre-feet (6,500,000 m^{3}). Recreation includes boating and fishing, and the site is surrounded by the southern tip of the Wenatchee National Forest. Also the YMCA of Yakima, Washington has Camp Dudley along its shores, a summer camp and retreat.
