= Yakima Valley Museum =

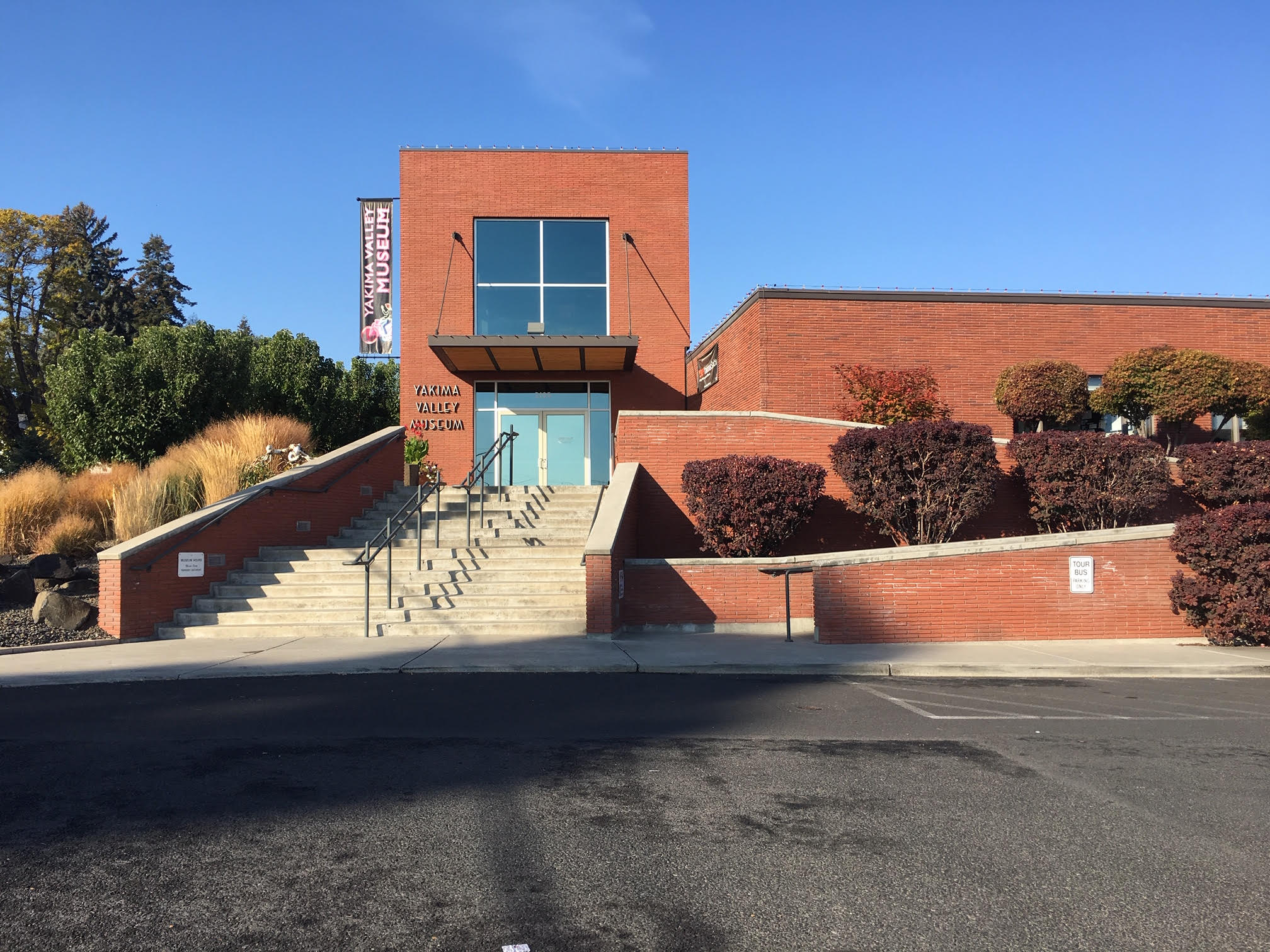

- Location within Washington (state)
- Established: 1952
- Location: 2105 Tieton Drive; Yakima, Washington
- Coordinates: 46.5929°N 120.5378°W
- Type: Local history
- Website: yakimavalleymuseum.org

The Yakima Valley Museum is a 65,000-square-foot (6,000 m^{2}) facility offers historical exhibits on the Yakima Valley—its natural history, American Indian culture, pioneer life, early city life, and the roots and development of the Valley's fruit industry.

== Exhibits ==
The museum has a superb collection of horse-drawn vehicles, from stagecoach to hearse. An historical exhibit and reconstruction of the Washington D.C. office of former Yakima resident and environmentalist, Supreme Court Justice William O. Douglas, an exhibit of petrified Miocene trees, a Neon Garden exhibit of vintage neon lights, and a changing schedule of special exhibitions.

The museum collections are always available for research and study by appointment. Within the museum is the Children's Underground, a 2,500 sq ft (230 m^{2}) interactive learning center offering museum-related educational activities and programs for children ages 5–15. The museum has a functioning replica of a late 1930s Art Deco soda fountain, called Museum Soda Fountain, that is furnished with salvaged and restored parts of authentic Yakima soda fountains. The museum's great hall, a grand performance space beneath the Neon Garden, offers programs and concerts throughout the year. The museum also operates the nearby, H. M. Gilbert Homeplace (2109 W. Yakima Ave); built in 1898, this late Victorian farmhouse is now filled with period furnishings.

== Yakima memory ==
In July 2001, the Yakima Valley Library and Yakima Valley Museum began a project titled Yakima Memory to digitize approximately 9,000 photographs in two collections, and provide access to the new digitized collections via the internet.
