= List of wildfires =

This is a list of notable wildfires.

== Africa ==
- 2017 Knysna fires, South Africa
- 2021 Algeria wildfires
- 2021 Table Mountain fire, South Africa
- 2022 Moroccan wildfires
- 2024 Western Cape wildfires, South Africa
- 2025 Table Mountain fire, South Africa
- 2026 Jijel Wildfire, Algeria

== Asia ==
=== China ===
- 1987 – The Black Dragon Fire burnt a total of 2.5 million acres (10,000 km^{2}; 3,900 sq mi) of forest along the Amur River, with 3 million acres (12,000 km^{2}; 4,700 sq mi) destroyed on the Chinese side alone and spread to the Soviet side.
- 1996 – Pat Sin Leng wildfire, Tai Po; 5 hikers killed (3 pupils and 2 teachers) on 10 February.

=== India ===
- 2016 Uttarakhand forest fires
- 2019 Bandipur forest fires
- 2020 Uttarakhand forest fires
- 2020–21 Dzüko Valley wildfires
- 2021 Simlipal forest fires

=== Indonesia ===
- 1997 Indonesian forest fires
- 2026 Indonesia wildfires

=== Israel ===
- 1989 Mount Carmel forest fire
- 1995 Jerusalem forest fire
- 2010 Mount Carmel forest fire – Started on 2 December 2010 and burned 50 km^{2} (19 sq mi) of forest, killing 44 people, most of them Israel Prison Service officer cadets, when a bus evacuating them was trapped in flames.
- November 2016 Israel wildfires
- 2021 Israel wildfires
- 2025 Israel–West Bank fires

=== Japan ===
- Kure wildfire
- Ōfunato wildfire

=== Kazakhstan ===
- 2022 Kazakhstan wildfires
- 2023 Kazakhstan wildfires – 14 people died in a series of forest fires caused by lightning in the northeast of the country.

=== Malaysia ===
- 2005 Malaysian haze

=== Mongolia ===
- 2022 Mongolian wildfires

=== Pakistan ===
- 2022 Khyber Pakhtunkhwa wildfires

=== South East Asia ===
- 1997 Southeast Asian haze
- 2006 Southeast Asian haze
- 2009 Southeast Asian haze
- 2010 Southeast Asian haze
- 2013 Southeast Asian haze
- 2015 Southeast Asian haze
- 2016 Southeast Asian haze
- 2017 Southeast Asian haze
- 2019 Southeast Asian haze

=== South Korea ===
- April 2000, Gangwon-do Gangneung wildfire
- March 2013, Gyeongsangbukdo Pohang wildfire.
- 2025 South Korea wildfires

=== Syria ===
- 2020 – Fires in Al-Suwayda Governorate in May, followed by Al-Hasakah Governorate in the summer, then in Latakia and Hama Governorates in September, next in Latakia again, Homs, and Tartus Governorates in October.

=== Vietnam ===
- 2019 Vietnam forest fires

== Arctic ==
According to the WTO in June 2019 arctic wildfires emitted 50 megatonnes (55 million short tons; 49 million long tons) of CO_{2}. This was more than between 2010 and 2018 combined. Most carbon release was from Alaska and Siberia, but also included other arctic areas e.g., in Canada. In Siberia the temperature was about 10 °C (18 °F) higher in June 2019 than the average. In Anchorage, Alaska, on 4 July 2019, the temperature was 32 °C (90 °F), setting a new all-time record high temperature for the town.

== Europe ==
=== Croatia ===
- 2007 Croatian coast fires, burning 1,590 km^{2} (610 sq mi).

=== France ===
- The 1949 Landes Forest Fire burned 50,000 ha (120,000 acres) of forest land and killed 82 people.
- 2021 France wildfires
- 2025 wildfire in southern France burns 11,000 hectares.
- 2026 France wildfires
  - 2026 Gironde's wildfire. As of the 26th of July 2026, 42,000 hectares have burnt.

=== Germany ===
- In the fire on the Lüneburg Heath in Lower Saxony in August 1975, 74.18 km^{2} (28.64 sq mi) of heathland burned, killing 5 firefighters.
- In May/June 1992 near Weißwasser (Saxony) 16 km^{2} (6.2 sq mi) of forest burned. One firefighter was killed in an accident.

=== Greece ===
- 1985 forest fires burnt 105,000 hectares with the worst affected being around Kavala in eastern Macedonia and Thasos Island in the north Aegean.
- 2000 forest fires were the worst forest fires to date and included the island of Samos in east Aegean and at Mount Mainalon and eastern Corinthia in the Peloponnese. The burnt area was 167,000 hectares which is the second highest in recent history (after the 2007 fires).
- 2007 Greek forest fires were by far the worst fires in recent Greek history. Over 270,000 hectares were burnt mostly in the Peloponnese region (especially in Elis region) and southern Evia as well as Mount Parnitha near Athens.
- 2009 Greek forest fires saw 21,000 hectares burnt around Mount Penteli near Athens.
- 2018 Greek wildfires were the deadliest in recent history with over 100 deaths in and around the village of Mati near Athens.
- 2021 Greek wildfires were the worst fires since 2007 with over 125,000 hectares burnt mostly in northern Evia, the Elis region of Peloponnese and around Tatoi near Athens.
- 2023 Greek wildfires
- 2024 Greek wildfires
- 2026 Greece wildfires

=== Italy ===
- 2021 Italy wildfires
- 2026 Italy wildfires

=== Mediterranean ===
- 2009 Mediterranean wildfires in France, Greece, Italy, Spain, and Turkey in July.
- 2022 European and Mediterranean wildfires

=== Poland ===
- 1992:
  - 10 August – a fire on the Noteć Forest burned 6,000 ha (15,000 acres) of forest.
  - 26 August – Kuźnia Raciborska fire: on a fire in and around Kuźnia Raciborska destroyed 90.62 km^{2} (34.99 sq mi) of forest and killed two firefighters.
- 2020: A fire in the Biebrza National Park burned 6,000 ha of forest.

=== Portugal ===
- August 2003 Wildfires, destroying 10% of Portuguese forests and killing 18 people.
- 2016 Portugal wildfires
- June 2017 Portugal wildfires and October 2017 Portugal wildfires, catastrophic series of fires that trapped and killed more than 100 people.
- 2018 - wildfires near the city of Portimao.
- 2024 Portugal wildfires
- 2026 Portugal wildfires

=== Russia ===
- July and August 1915 Siberian wildfires fires burned for 50 days and burned about 14 million ha.
- 1921 Mari wildfires
- August 1935 – Kursha-2 settlement was burned out with 1,200 victims.
- 2003 Siberian Taiga wildfires – more than 200,000 km^{2} (20 million ha; 49 million acres), primarily boreal forest, were burned in southern Siberia from 14 March to 8 August. Direct carbon emissions were around 400-640 TgC (440–710 million short tons; 390–630 million long tons).
- 2010 Russian wildfires – Drought and the hottest summer since records began in 1890 caused many devastating forest fires in European Russia.
- 2015 Russian wildfires – A series of wildfires in southern Siberia killed 26 people and left thousands homeless.
- 2018 Russian wildfires
- 2019 Russian wildfires – 27,000 km^{2} (2.7 million ha; 6.7 million acres) were burned as of 2 August according to Russia's Federal Forestry Agency (3.3 million ha (33,000 km^{2}; 8.2 million acres) according to Greenpeace).
- 2020 Russian wildfires
- 2021 Russian wildfires
- 2022 Siberian wildfires
- 2024 Russian wildfires

=== Spain ===
- 17 July 2005 – Guadalajara province – a forest fire caused by an improperly extinguished barbecue burned 130 km^{2} (50 sq mi) and killed 11 firefighters. The environmental councilor of Castilla-La Mancha, Rosario Arévalo, resigned from her position as a result.
- 2016 Benidorm forest fire – burnt more than 800 hectares (2,000 acres) and destroyed at least 20 homes.
- June 2019 – 10,000 acres (4,000 ha) burning near Tarragona.
- 2019 Canary Islands wildfires
- 2023 Tenerife wildfire
- 2026 Spain wildfires
  - 2026 Almería wildfire

=== Turkey ===
- 2009 Mediterranean wildfires
- 2020 Turkish wildfires
- 2021 Turkish wildfires

=== Sweden ===
- 2014 Västmanland wildfire – a 191 km^{2} (74 sq mi) forest fire with 1 verified death.
- 2018 Sweden wildfires

=== Ukraine ===
- Wildfire near Kreminna, 1996 – around 70 km^{2} (7,000 ha)
- Wildfire in Kherson Oblast (uk), 2007 – more than 87.5 km^{2} (87,500 ha)
- 2020 Chernobyl Exclusion Zone wildfires – 470 km^{2} (47,000 ha)

=== United Kingdom ===
- May 2011 – Swinley Forest fire, Berkshire, England. Fire appliances from 12 counties attended over several days due to the large area of the fire. The fire service incident log for the call was over 500 pages long.
- 2018 United Kingdom wildfires
- 2019 United Kingdom wildfires
- 2022 United Kingdom wildfires
- Cannich wildfire
- 2025 United Kingdom wildfires
- 2026 United Kingdom wildfires

== North America ==
In the largest wildfire on the list, the area of Canada that burned in 2023 wildfires was more than twice that of any prior year of record.

=== Canada and the United States ===
From 2007 to 2017, wildfires burned an average of 6.2 to 6.6 million acres (2.5 to 2.7 million ha) per year in the U.S. and Canada, respectively.

† Indicates a currently burning fire

| Year | Size | Name | Area | Notes |
|---|---|---|---|---|
| 1825 | 3,000,000 acres (1,200,000 ha) | 1825 Miramichi fire | New Brunswick | Killed between 160 and 300 people. |
| 1845 | 1,500,000 acres (610,000 ha) | The Great Fire | Oregon | |
| 1865 | 1,000,000 acres (400,000 ha) | The Silverton Fire | Oregon | |
| 1853 | 450,000 acres (180,000 ha) | The Yaquina Fire | Oregon | |
| 1868 | 300,000 acres (120,000 ha) | The Coos Fire | Oregon | |
| 1870 | 964,000 acres (390,000 ha) | Saguenay Fire | Quebec | |
| 1871 | 1,200,000 acres (490,000 ha) | Peshtigo Fire | Wisconsin | Killed between 1,200 and 2,500 people and has the distinction of being the conflagration that caused the most deaths by fire in United States history. It was overshadowed by the Great Chicago Fire that occurred on the same day. |
| 1871 | 2,500,000 acres (1,000,000 ha) | Great Michigan Fire | Michigan | Overshadowed by the Great Chicago Fire that occurred on the same day. |
| 1876 | 500,000 acres (200,000 ha) | Bighorn Fire | Wyoming | |
| 1881 | 1,000,000 acres (400,000 ha) | Thumb Fire | Michigan | Killed 282 people. |
| 1889 | 300,000 acres (120,000 ha) | Santiago Canyon Fire | California | |
| 1894 | 350,000 acres (140,000 ha) | Great Hinckley Fire | Minnesota | Killed 418+ people and destroyed 12 towns. |
| 1898 | 2,500,000 acres (1,000,000 ha) | | South Carolina | |
| 1902 | 238,900 acres (96,700 ha) | Yacolt Burn | Washington and Oregon | 65+ deaths, plus 20 other fire events from 1910 - 1952. |
| 1903 | 464,000 acres (188,000 ha) | Adirondack Fire | New York | |
| 1908 | 64,000 acres (25,900 ha) | 1908 Fernie Fire | British Columbia | Town of Fernie, BC destroyed. 22 casualties reported. Cause: logging slash. |
| 1910 | 3,000,000 acres (1,200,000 ha) | Great Fire of 1910 | Idaho and Montana | 87 people (including 78 firefighters) killed and several towns destroyed across north Idaho and western Montana. ~2,000 separate blazes burned an area the size of Connecticut in what is believed to have been the largest fire in recorded U.S. history up to that point, although it has since been exceeded by the 2011 Texas wildfires and the 2020 California wildfires. |
| 1911 | 500,000 acres (200,000 ha) | Great Porcupine Fire | Ontario | Killed between 73 and 200 people. |
| 1916 | 500,000 acres (200,000 ha) | Great Matheson Fire | Ontario | Killed 223 people according to official figures, and destroyed several towns, Cochrane burnt again after just five years. |
| 1918 | 100,000 acres (40,000 ha) | Cloquet Fire | Minnesota and Wisconsin | Killed 453 people. |
| 1919 | 5,000,000 acres (2,023,000 ha) | Great Fire of 1919 | Alberta and Saskatchewan | Spanning from Lac La Biche, AB to almost Prince Albert, SK. Village of Lac La Biche destroyed. 300+ people homeless. An estimated $200,000 in property damage. Cause: drought, high winds, lightning. Forest Fire area burned is an estimation. |
| 1922 | 415,000 acres (168,000 ha) | Great Fire of 1922 | Ontario | Killed 43 people and burnt through 18 townships in the Timiskaming District. |
| 1923 | | Giant Berkeley Fire | California | Leveled 50 city blocks, destroying 624 buildings. |
| 1933 | 47 acres (19 ha) | 1933 Griffith Park Fire | California | Killed 29 firefighters and injured more than 150 people. |
| 1933 | 350,000 acres (140,000 ha) | Tillamook Burn | Oregon | |
| 1935 | 35,000 acres (14,000 ha) | Big Scrub Fire | Florida | The fire spread at 6 miles per hour (9.7 km/h), the fastest spreading fire in US Forest Service history. |
| 1937 | 1,700 acres (690 ha) | Blackwater Creek Fire | Wyoming | Killed 15 firefighters. |
| 1947 | 175,000 acres (71,000 ha) | Great Fires of 1947 | Maine | A series of fires that lasted ten days; 16 people killed. Destroyed part of Bar Harbor and damaged Acadia National Park. |
| 1949 | 4,500 acres (1,800 ha) | Mann Gulch fire | Montana | 12 firefighters who parachuted near the fire and 1 forest ranger died after being overtaken by a 200-foot wall of fire at the top of a gulch near Helena, Montana. |
| 1950 | 3,500,000 acres (1,400,000 ha) | Chinchaga Fire | British Columbia and Alberta | Largest single North American fire on record. The B.C. portion was just 90,000 ha. |
| 1953 | 1,300 acres (530 ha) | Rattlesnake Fire | California | Killed 15 firefighters. Well known textbook case used to train firefighters. |
| 1958 | 558,260 acres (225,920 ha) | Kech Fire | British Columbia | Largest wildfire in BC history until the 2017 Plateau Fire of 521,012 hectares. |
| 1961 | 16,090 acres (6,510 ha) | Bel Air Fire | California | 484 homes destroyed and ~112 injuries. |
| 1963 | 183,000 acres (74,000 ha) | Black Saturday Fire | New Jersey | 400 buildings destroyed and 7 people killed. |
| 1970 | 175,425 acres (70,992 ha) | Laguna Fire | California | 382 homes destroyed and 8 people killed. |
| 1977 | 10,000 acres (4,000 ha) | Marble Cone Fire | California | Vandenberg Air Force Base, 4 people killed, including the base commander, and two fire chiefs. |
| 1983 | 45,000 acres (18,000 ha) | Swiss Fire | British Columbia | Houston, British Columbia, destroyed 7 residences. |
| 1985 | 93,000 acres (38,000 ha) | Allen Fire | North Carolina | Nearly 93,000 acres of forest, wetlands and farmland burned in northeastern North Carolina in one of the biggest fires in modern state history. |
| 1987 | 650,000 acres (260,000 ha) | Siege of 1987 | California and Oregon | Cause: large lightning storm in late August. The storm started roughly 1,600 new fires, most caused by dry lightning. |
| 1988 | 793,880 acres (321,270 ha) | Yellowstone fires of 1988 | Wyoming and Montana | Never controlled by firefighters; only burned out when a snowstorm hit. |
| 1989 | 8,105,000 acres (3,280,000 ha) | The Manitoba Fires | Manitoba | 1,147 wildfires in central and northern Manitoba in the spring & summer. 24,500 people evacuated from 32 communities. Over 100 homes destroyed. Worst fire season in province's history. Cause: severe drought, human and natural ignition sources. |
| 1990 | 5,000 acres (2,000 ha) | Painted Cave Fire | California | 1 death and 430 buildings burned in this arson fire near Santa Barbara. |
| 1991 | 1,520 acres (620 ha) | Oakland Hills firestorm | California | Killed 25 and destroyed 3,469 homes and apartments within the cities of Oakland and Berkeley. |
| 1993 | 14,337 acres (5,802 ha) | Laguna Beach Fire | California | Destroyed 441 homes, burned 14,337 acres causing $528,000,000 in damage. |
| 1994 | 2,115 acres (856 ha) | South Canyon Fire | Colorado | Killed 14 firefighters. |
| 1995 | 12,354 acres (4,999 ha) | Mount Vision Fire | California | 45 homes destroyed. |
| 1996 | 37,336 acres (15,109 ha) | Miller's Reach Fire | Alaska | Most destructive wildfire in Alaska history. 344 structures destroyed. |
| 1998 | 506,000 acres (205,000 ha) | 1998 Florida wildfires | Florida | 4,899 fires, burned 342 homes, and $390 million worth of timber was lost. |
| 1998 | 14,800 acres (6,000 ha) | Silver Creek Fire | British Columbia | Immediately southwest of Salmon Arm, BC. Cause: lightning. Approximately 7,000 people evacuated. Over 40 buildings destroyed. Cost over $10,000,000 to extinguish. |
| 1999 | 140,948 acres (57,040 ha) | Big Bar Complex Fire | California | Started August. |
| 2000 | 48,000 acres (19,000 ha) | Cerro Grande Fire | New Mexico | Burned about 420 dwellings in Los Alamos, New Mexico, damaged >100 buildings at Los Alamos National Laboratory; $1 billion damage. |
| 2001 | 9,300 acres (3,800 ha) | Thirtymile Fire | Washington | Killed 4 firefighters. |
| 2002 | 92,000 acres (37,000 ha) | Ponil Complex Fire | New Mexico | Also called the Philmont fire. |
| 2002 | 31,016 acres (12,552 ha) | Mt. Zirkel Complex Fire | Colorado | Started August. |
| 2002 | 467,066 acres (189,015 ha) | Rodeo–Chediski Fire | Arizona | Threatened, but did not burn the town of Show Low, Arizona. |
| 2002 | 137,760 acres (55,750 ha) | Hayman Fire in Pike National Forest | Colorado | 1 civilian and 5 firefighter deaths, 600 structures fires. |
| 2002 | 499,750 acres (202,240 ha) | Florence/Sour Biscuit Complex Fire | Oregon | $150 million to suppress. |
| 2003 | 84,750 acres (34,300 ha) | Aspen Fire | Arizona | Destroyed large portions of Summerhaven, Arizona. |
| 2003 | 61,776 acres (25,000 ha) | Okanagan Mountain Park Fire | British Columbia | Displaced 45,000 inhabitants, destroyed 239 homes and threatened urbanized sections of Kelowna. |
| 2003 | 90,769 acres (36,733 ha) | B&B Complex fires | Oregon | Burned along the crest of the Cascade Mountains between Mount Washington and Mount Jefferson including 40,419 acres (163.57 km^{2}) within the Mount Jefferson Wilderness. |
| 2003 | 91,281 acres (36,940 ha) | Old Fire | California | 993 homes destroyed, 6 deaths. Simultaneous with the Cedar fire. |
| 2003 | 273,246 acres (110,579 ha) | Cedar Fire | California | Third largest recorded fire in modern California history; burned 2,232 homes and killed 15 in San Diego County. |
| 2004 | 1,305,592 acres (528,354 ha) | Taylor Complex Fire | Alaska | Largest wildfire by acreage of 1997–2007 time period. |
| 2006 | 40,200 acres (16,300 ha) | Esperanza Fire | California | Arson-caused wildfire that killed 5 firefighters and destroyed 34 homes and 20 outbuildings. |
| 2006 | 160,000 acres (65,000 ha) | Day Fire | California | 1 residence burned, no casualties. |
| 2007 | 564,450 acres (228,420 ha) | Sweat Farm Road/Big Turnaround Complex Fire | Georgia | Largest recorded fire in Georgia history. 26 structures were lost. |
| 2007 | 124,584 acres (50,417 ha) | Florida Bugaboo Fire | Florida | Largest fire on record in Florida. |
| 2007 | 18,000 acres (7,300 ha) | Warren Grove Fire | New Jersey | Forest fire in the New Jersey Pine Barrens caused by a flare from an F-16 jet. Destroyed 4 homes, damaged 53 homes, injured 2. |
| 2007 | 363,052 acres (146,922 ha) | Milford Flat Fire | Utah | Largest fire on record in Utah. |
| 2007 | 653,100 acres (264,300 ha) | Murphy Complex Fire | Idaho and Nevada | |
| 2007 | 240,207 acres (97,208 ha) | Zaca Fire | California | Started July. Second largest California fire at the time after the Cedar fire of 2003. |
| 2007 | 972,000 acres (393,000 ha) | October 2007 California wildfires | California | A series of wildfires that killed 9 people and injured 85 (including 61 firefighters). Burned at least 1,500 homes from the Santa Barbara County to the U.S.–Mexico border. |
| 2008 | 41,534 acres (16,808 ha) | Evans Road Wildfire | North Carolina | Peat fire started on 1 June by lightning strike during North Carolina's drought – the worst on record. |
| 2008 | 1,557,293 acres (630,214 ha) | 2008 California wildfires | California | In northern California, the fires were mostly started by lightning. In Santa Barbara (southern California), the Gap fire endangered homes and lives. The Basin Complex and Gap fire were the highest priority fires in the state at this time. |
| 2009 | 19,130 acres (7,740 ha) | Highway 31 Fire | South Carolina | Brush fire in Myrtle Beach, the most destructive fire in terms of loss in state history. Destroyed 76 homes and damaged 97. |
| 2009 | 164,500 acres (66,600 ha) | Brittany Triangle Fire | British Columbia | Also known as the Lava Canyon fire, this was the largest fire in BC in 2009. Started on 31 July by lightning, this fire made news when it threatened a wild horse population. |
| 2010 | 98,842 acres (40,000 ha) | Binta Lake Fire | British Columbia | BC's largest blaze of 2010, resulted in evacuation orders and alerts. Burned 70,000 acres in a 12-hour period. |
| 2011 | 538,049 acres (217,741 ha) | Wallow Fire | Arizona and New Mexico | The largest fire in Arizona state history. In one 24-hour burn period (6/6-6/7), it consumed 77,769 acres of forest land. |
| 2011 | 34,000 acres (14,000 ha) | Bastrop County Complex Fire | Texas | The worst fire in Texas state history, destroyed over 1,500 homes. |
| 2011 | 1,748,636 acres (707,648 ha) | Richardson Backcountry Fire | Alberta | The largest Canadian fire since 1950. |
| 2011 | 156,293 acres (63,250 ha) | Las Conchas Fire | New Mexico | Third largest fire in New Mexico state history. 63 homes lost. Threatened Los Alamos National Laboratory. |
| 2011 | 12,000 acres (4,900 ha) | Slave Lake Wildfire | Alberta | Burned through Slave Lake, Alberta, Canada and its surrounding area from 14 May through 16 May. The fire destroyed roughly one-third of Slave Lake and cost $1.8 billion. |
| 2011 | 4,011,709 acres (1,623,481 ha) | 2011 Texas wildfires | Texas | Wildfires began in November 2010 and continued to rage due to a severe drought that lasted 271 months. 47.3% of all acreage burned in the United States in 2011 was burned in Texas. Firefighters came from over 43 states to assist, with 2 losing their lives. The Governor of Texas declared a State of Disaster on 21 December 2010, and renewed the proclamation monthly. On 16 April 2011, President Obama was asked to declare a state of emergency in 252 of the 254 counties after approximately 2,000,000 acres had burnt. On 1 July 2011, the request was partially granted. |
| 2012 | 289,478 acres (117,148 ha) | Whitewater–Baldy complex Fire | New Mexico | Second-largest wildfire in New Mexico state history. Began in the Gila Wilderness as two separate fires that converged, both started by lightning. Destroyed 12 homes in Willow Creek, NM. |
| 2012 | 44,330 acres (17,940 ha) | Little Bear Fire | New Mexico | Second-most destructive wildfire in New Mexico state history. Began in the Lincoln National Forest and was started by lightning. |
| 2012 | 87,284 acres (35,323 ha) | High Park Fire | Colorado | Started by lightning, it is the second largest wildfire in Colorado state history by size. |
| 2012 | 18,247 acres (7,384 ha) | Waldo Canyon Fire | Colorado | Rampart Range and West Colorado Springs with 346 homes destroyed primarily in the Mountain Shadows neighborhood, it is the second most destructive fire in state history. Two fatalities reported. |
| 2012 | 248,000 acres (100,000 ha) | Ash Creek Fire | Montana | |
| 2012 | 719,694 acres (291,250 ha) | Long Draw Fire and Miller Homestead Fire | Oregon | Oregon's largest fire in 150 years. |
| 2012 | 332,000 acres (134,000 ha) | Mustang Complex Wildfire | Idaho | |
| 2012 | 315,557 acres (127,701 ha) | Rush Fire | California and Nevada | |
| 2013 | 14,198 acres (5,746 ha) | Black Forest Fire | Colorado | North of Colorado Springs, the Black Forest fire was a large, fast-spreading fire due to dry conditions, high heat, and restless winds. Destroyed 509 homes and left 17 homes partially damaged. As of 13 June, it became the most destructive fire in Colorado state history. |
| 2013 | 1,300 acres (530 ha) | Yarnell Hill Fire | Arizona | 19 firefighters killed on 30 June. |
| 2013 | 617,763 acres (250,000 ha) | Quebec Fire | Quebec | Over 300 evacuated. |
| 2013 | 253,332 acres (102,520 ha) | Rim Fire | California | Occurred in Yosemite National Park. Biggest wildfire on record in the Sierra Nevada, and fourth largest wildfire in California history. Started 17 August and was contained on 24 October. |
| 2013 | 113,600 acres (46,000 ha) | Beaver Creek Fire | Idaho | Started June. |
| 2014 | 252,000 acres (102,000 ha) | Carlton Complex Fire | Washington | 4 wildfires merged to become the largest single wildfire in Washington state history. (Of the 3,000,000 acres Great Fire of 1910, only 150,000 acres were in Washington.) |
| 2014 | 8,400,000 acres (3,400,000 ha) | 2014 Northwest Territories fires | Northwest Territories | Said to have been the largest set of wildfires in 30 years in the Northwest Territories. Total cost of firefighting was between C$55 and C$56 million compared to the normal budget C$7.5 million. There were no reported deaths. |
| 2015 | 302,224 acres (122,306 ha) | Okanogan Complex | Washington | The largest wildfire complex in Washington state history. |
| 2016 | 367,620 acres (148,770 ha) | Anderson Creek Fire | Kansas and Oklahoma | Largest wildfire in Kansas history. |
| 2016 | 1,466,990 acres (593,670 ha) | Fort McMurray Wildfire | Alberta and Saskatchewan | Largest fire evacuation in Alberta history (88,000 on 3 May, a further 8,000 on 16 May). Over 2,400 homes and buildings destroyed. Costliest disaster in Canadian history. |
| 2016 | 19,800 acres (8,000 ha) | 2016 Great Smoky Mountains wildfires | Tennessee | Began in late November 2016. It significantly impacted the towns of Pigeon Forge and Gatlinburg, both near Great Smoky Mountains National Park. The fires claimed at least 14 lives, injured 190, and is one of the largest natural disasters in the history of Tennessee. |
| 2016 | | August 2016 Western United States wildfires | California, Idaho, Montana, Nevada, Oregon, Washington and Wyoming | |
| 2017 | 3,004,932 acres (1,216,053 ha) | 2017 British Columbia wildfires | British Columbia | The 2017 BC fire season is notable for three reasons: first, for the largest total area burnt in a fire season in recorded history; second, for the largest number of total evacuees in a fire season (Estimated 65,000 evacuees); and third, for the largest single fire ever in British Columbia. |
| 2017 | 1,295,000 acres (524,000 ha) | 2017 Montana wildfires | Montana | Contained by rain and snow by mid-September. |
| 2017 | 240,000 acres (97,000 ha) | October 2017 Northern California wildfires | California | The October northern California wildfires were a large group of forest fires that killed 44 people and destroyed 8,900 structures. |
| 2017 | 281,893 acres (114,078 ha) | Thomas Fire | California | Largest wildfire in modern California history at the time (1889 Santiago Canyon fire may have been larger). Spread fast due to strong winds and unusual dry weather in December. |
| 2017 | 28,516 acres (11,540 ha) | Goodwin Fire | Arizona | Shut down parts of Highway 69 between Mayer and Dewey-Humboldt. The fire destroyed 5 homes and damaged 2 more. |
| 2018 | 3,346,508 acres (1,354,284 ha) | 2018 British Columbia wildfires | British Columbia | Initial estimates put 2018 as the largest total burn-area in any British Columbia wildfire season, surpassing the historic 2017 wildfire season. |
| 2018 | 108,043 acres (43,723 ha) | Spring Creek Fire | Colorado | Started June. |
| 2018 | 459,102 acres (185,792 ha) | Mendocino Complex Fire | California | 229 structures destroyed, 2 reported deaths. |
| 2018 | 229,651 acres (92,936 ha) | Carr Fire | California | 1,604 structures destroyed, 8 reported deaths. |
| 2018 | 96,949 acres (39,234 ha) | Woolsey Fire | California | 1,643 structures destroyed, 3 fatalities, 5 injuries. |
| 2018 | 149,000 acres (60,000 ha) | Camp Fire | California | 18,804 structures destroyed, 85 confirmed deaths, 2 missing, 17 injured, deadliest and most destructive wildfire in California to date. |
| 2019 | 170,000 acres (69,000 ha) | Swan Lake Fire | Alaska | Started in June on the Kenai Peninsula. |
| 2020 | 600,000 acres (240,000 ha) | 2020 Colorado wildfires | Colorado | Low-end estimate of burned acreage based on Inciweb since May in Colorado. The state's worst fire season on record. The season of the Hayman Fire saw 360,000 acres burn - which was the previous record holder. |
| 2020 | 119,987 acres (48,557 ha) | Bighorn Fire | Arizona | Started in June south of Phoenix. |
| 2020 | 193,455 acres (78,288 ha) | Bush Fire | Arizona | Started June near Theodore Roosevelt Lake just north of Phoenix. |
| 2020 | 75,817 acres (30,682 ha) | Evans Canyon Fire | Washington | Started in September near Yakima, WA. |
| 2020 | 17,988 acres (7,279 ha) | Palmer Fire | Washington | Started September in northern Washington near Canada. |
| 2020 | 176,878 acres (71,580 ha) | Mullen Fire | Colorado and Wyoming | Started in September near Laramie and spread to Jackson County, Colorado by October. The fire forced evacuations in Wyoming and northern Colorado. |
| 2020 | 1,032,468 acres (417,825 ha) | August Complex Fire | California | Largest wildfire in California history. This fire was divided into three zones: the August Complex North Zone (Elkhorn Fire), the August Complex South Zone (Doe Fire), and the August Complex West Zone due to the enormous size. |
| 2020 | 1,000,000 acres (400,000 ha) | 2020 Oregon wildfires | Oregon | Destroyed over 3,000 buildings, and killed at least 10 people. |
| 2020 | 4,420,301 acres (1,788,832 ha) | 2020 California wildfires | California | Largest California wildfire season in recorded history. |
| 2022 | 341,471 acres (138,188 ha) | Calf Canyon/Hermits Peak Fire | New Mexico | Largest and most destructive wildfire in the recorded history of New Mexico. |
| 2023 | 45,700,000 acres (18,496,000 ha) | 2023 Canadian wildfires | Canada (10 provinces and 3 territories) | Largest Canadian wildfire season in recorded history. |
| 2023 | 14,000+ acres (5,556+ ha) | 2023 Hawaii wildfires | Hawaii | Deadliest wildfire in recorded Hawaii history, referred to as worst natural disaster in history of Hawaii by Governor Josh Green. |
| 2023 | 11,020 acres (4,460 ha) | Matt's Creek Fire | Virginia | |
| 2024 | 1,100,000 acres (445,154 ha) | Smokehouse Creek Fire | Texas and Oklahoma | Large wildfire in the Texas panhandle region, largest in Texas history. |
| 2024 | 429,603 acres (173,854 ha) | Park Fire | California | Largest fire caused by arson in California |
| 2024 | 14,104 acres (5,708 ha) | Coffee Pot Fire | California | Injured 3 firefighters. |
| 2025 | 57,636 acres (23,324 ha) | Southern California wildfires | California | At least twenty-eight people have died, and more than 18,189+ structures destroyed or damaged. |
| 2026 | 642,029 acres | Morrill Fire | Nebraska | Largest fire in Nebraska history, part of a series of fires that burned 945,381 acres. |
| 2026 | 11,000,000 acres (4,450,000 ha) (ongoing) | 2026 Canadian wildfires | Canada | |

- August 2016 Western United States Wildfires - California, Idaho, Montana, Nevada, Oregon, Washington and Wyoming were affected with evacuations taking place in Oregon, Nevada and Wyoming.

=== Greenland ===
Some wildfires occurred in Greenland in August 2017.

There was a large wildfire between Sisimiut and Kangerlussuaq from July to August 2019. It was put out by members of Beredskabsstyrelsen, who were flown in.

=== Mexico ===
- 2021 Nuevo León wildfires

== Oceania ==
=== Australia ===
- Black Thursday bushfires of 1851 (Victoria) with 5 million hectares burnt. This record was broken in the 2019/2020 Black Summer.
- Black Friday bushfires of 1939 (Victoria) with 2 million hectares burnt.
- Black Sunday bushfires of 1955 (South Australia)
- 1961 Western Australian bushfires with 1,800,000 hectares burnt.
- Black Tuesday bushfires of 1967 (Tasmania) with 260,000 hectares burnt.
- 1974-75 Australian bushfire season (Queensland, New South Wales, South Australia, Western Australia)
- Ash Wednesday bushfires of 1983 (Victoria and South Australia) with 520,000 hectares burnt.
- 1994 Eastern seaboard fires (New South Wales) with 800,000 hectares burnt.
- Black Christmas bushfires 2001–2002 (New South Wales) with 750,000 hectares burnt.
- Canberra bushfires of 2003
- Black Saturday bushfires of 2009 (Victoria) with 400,000 hectares burnt and the highest death toll of over 170 deaths.
- 2019–20 Australian bushfire season – "Black summer" – the worst bushfire season in modern Australian history. Nationwide burned (approximately) a total of 18,636,079 hectares (46,050,750 acres).
- 2023–24 Australian bushfire season with 96,081,928 hectares burnt.

=== New Zealand ===
- Raetihi forest fire (Manawatū)
- 2017 Port Hills fires (Canterbury)
- 2019 Nelson fires
- 2024 Port Hills fire (Canterbury)

== South America ==
=== Argentina ===
- 2008 Delta del Paraná wildfires
- 2020 Delta del Paraná wildfires
- 2020 Córdoba wildfires
- 2021 Argentine Patagonia wildfires
- 2022 Corrientes wildfires
- 2024 Argentina wildfires
- 2026 Argentina wildfires

=== Bolivia ===
- 2010 Bolivia forest fires

=== Brazil ===
- 1974 Amazon wildfires due to Volkswagen's ranch "Companhia Vale do Rio Cristalino", 25 000 km^{2} of forest burned.
- 2019 Brazil wildfires
- 2020 Brazil rainforest wildfires
- 2024 Brazil wildfires at São Paulo

=== Colombia ===
- 2024 Colombia wildfires

=== Chile ===
- 2011–2012 Torres del Paine fire
- 2012 Araucanía wildfires
- 2014 Valparaíso wildfire
- 2017 Chile wildfires
- 2021 Chilean Patagonia wildfire
- 2022 Tierra del Fuego wildfire
- 2023 Chile wildfires
- 2024 Chile wildfires

=== Ecuador ===
- 1985 Isabela Island forest fire, Galápagos Islands, 62,500 acres (253 km^{2}) lost in March.

=== Venezuela ===
- 2020 Cagua fire

== See also ==
- List of fires (all types)
- List of natural disasters by death toll § Wildfires
- List of largest fires of the 21st century
- List of town and city fires
- Wildfires in 2023
