= Wildfires in 2022 =

Wildfires on multiple continents

2022 wildfire season
- Date: January–December 2022

The 2022 wildfire season involved wildfires on multiple continents.

Below is a partial list of articles on wildfires from around the world in the year 2022.

== Africa ==
- 2022 Moroccan wildfires

== Asia ==
- 2022 Kazakh wildfires
- 2022 Mongolian wildfires
- 2022 Khyber Pakhtunkhwa wildfires, Pakistan
- 2022 Siberian wildfires

== Europe ==
- 2022 European and Mediterranean wildfires

== North America ==
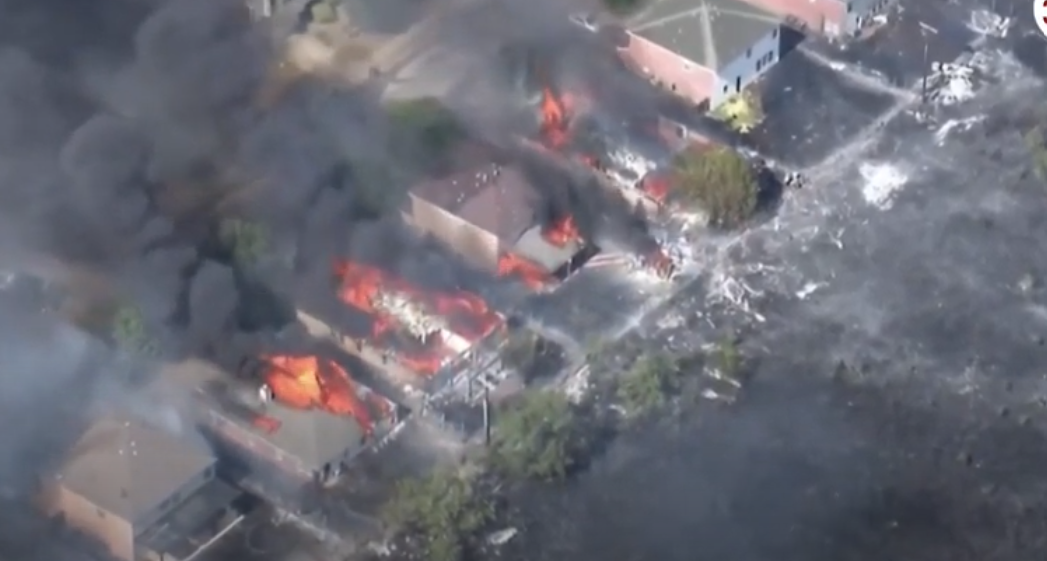
A grass fire burning homes in the suburbs of Dallas, Texas

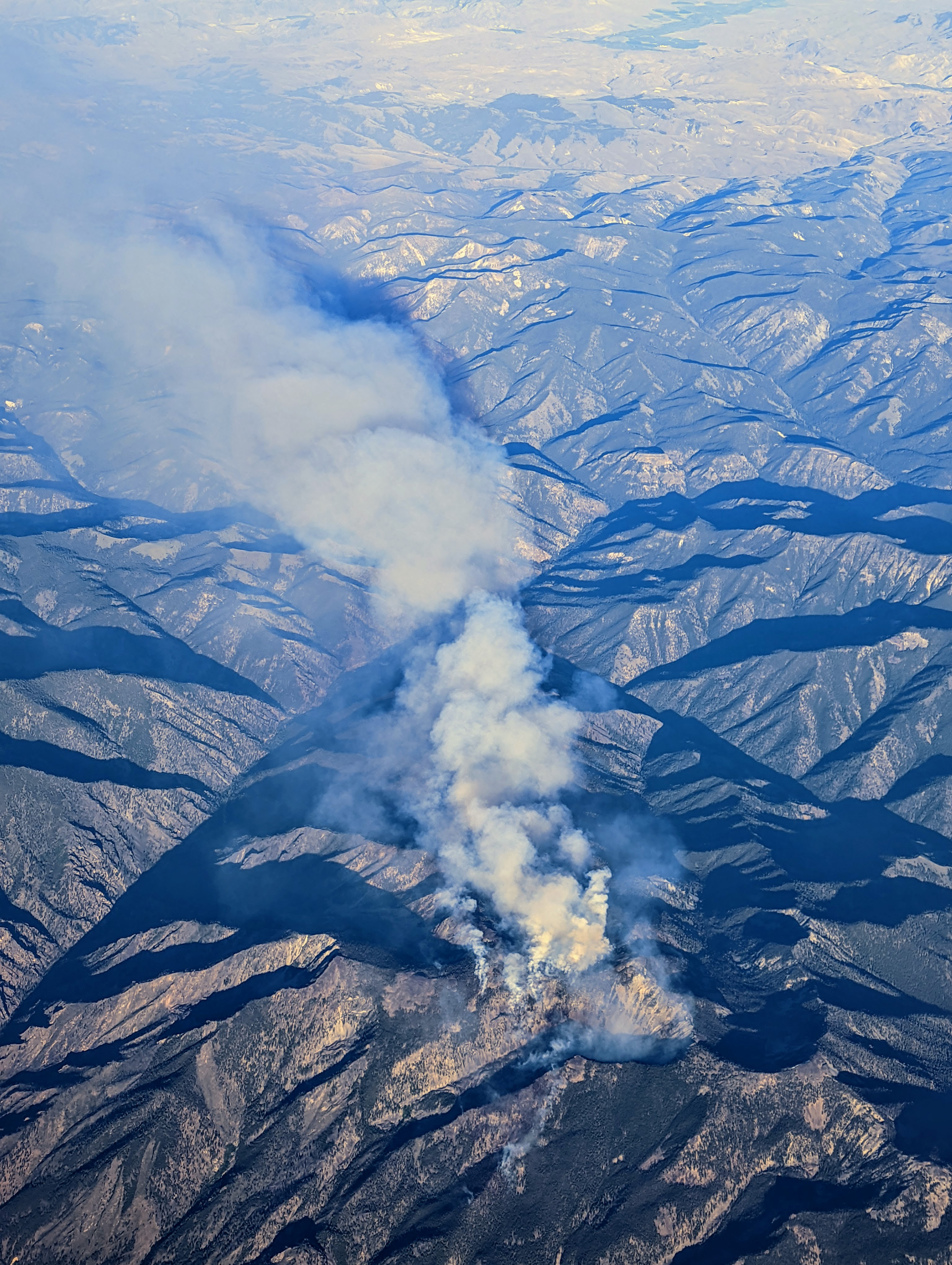
The Moose Fire, north of Salmon, Idaho, July 22, 2022

- 2022 Arizona wildfires
  - June 2022 Flagstaff wildfires
- 2022 Colorado wildfires
- 2022 California wildfires
- 2022 Oregon wildfires
- 2022 New Mexico wildfires
- 2022 Texas wildfires
- 2022 Washington wildfires
- Mullica River fire

== Oceania ==
- 2021–22 Australian bushfire season

== South America ==
Wildfires within the Amazon River Basin in 2022

- 2022 Corrientes wildfires, Argentina
- 2022 Araucanía wildfires, Chile
- 2022 Tierra del Fuego wildfire, Chile

== See also ==
- Weather of 2022
