= Uttarakhand forest fire =

Uttarakhand forest fire may refer to:

- 2016 Uttarakhand forest fires
- 2020 Uttarakhand forest fires
