= 2019 Bandipur forest fires =

Series of fires in Karnataka, India

Bandipur forest fires
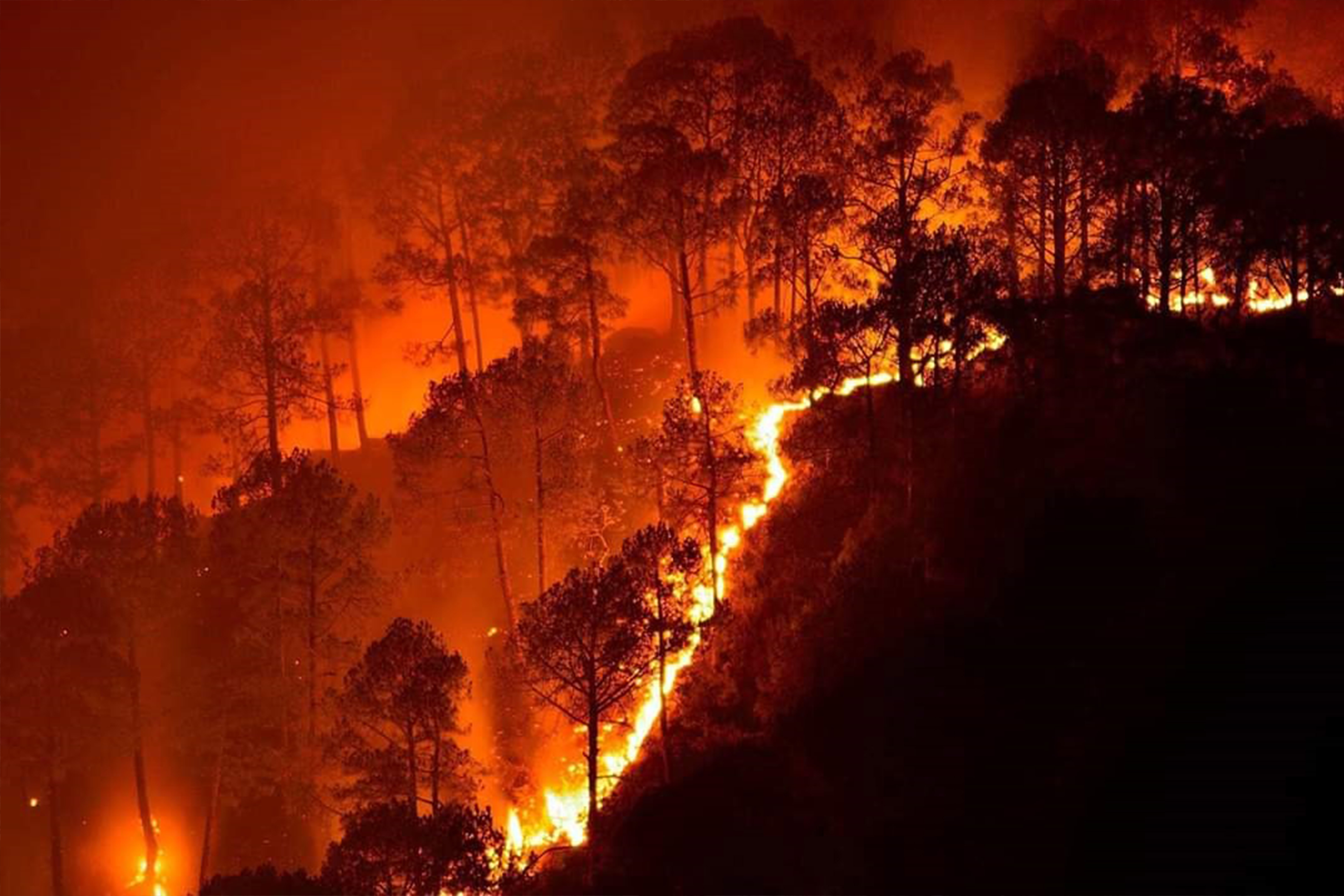
- Bandipur wildfire spreading across forest area
- Date: 21 February 2019 – 25 February 2019
- Location: Chamarajanagar district, Karnataka in, India
- Coordinates: 11°39′42″N 76°37′38″E

Statistics
- Burned area: 4,419.54 hectares (10,920.9 acres)

Impacts
- Deaths: Many creatures

Ignition
- Cause: act of sabotage

Satellite image of the wildfires burning in Bandipur forest area; smoke can be seen trailing southwestward over Kerala

In February 2019, major forest fires broke out in numerous places across the Bandipur National Park in Karnataka state in India. The National Remote Sensing Centre of the Indian Space Research Organisation (ISRO) carried out an assessment of the total area affected by the fire. On 25 February 2019, it estimated the extent of burnt area to be about 10,920 acres in the last five days from 21 February 2019.

Though the major fire was brought under control by 24 February 2019, some areas continued to burn. The fire also spread to Mudumalai National Park in Tamil Nadu, causing damage to around 40 acres. The Tamil Nadu forest department took action to ensure that it did not spread further.

== Background ==
On 21 February 2019, a wildfire broke out in the Bandipur Tiger Reserve. Unlike in previous years, this was the first time the wildfire in Bandipur flared up earlier due to the sudden climatic change and rapid growth of dry grass and Lantana. Officials reported that there appeared to have been no deaths of the larger mammals in the park, such as bison, elephants, leopard and tiger.

Over 10,000 acres of forest in Bandipur area was destroyed. With the fire spreading rapidly due to winds, the authorities closed the Gundlupet-Ooty National highway and safaris in Bandipur National Park were also cancelled. Strong winds were making the job of firefighters, forest staff and volunteers more difficult.

The fire that destroyed Kundakere Range, spread to Barakatte and Guddakere, then to the Himavathi Gopalaswamy Hills. It also destroyed forests in Jarkal Kere and Gowri Kalu hills. Many smaller mammals and reptiles were killed, along with thousands of trees. There had been no forest-fire incidents noted in Bandipur National Park in the previous two years.

== Firefighting ==
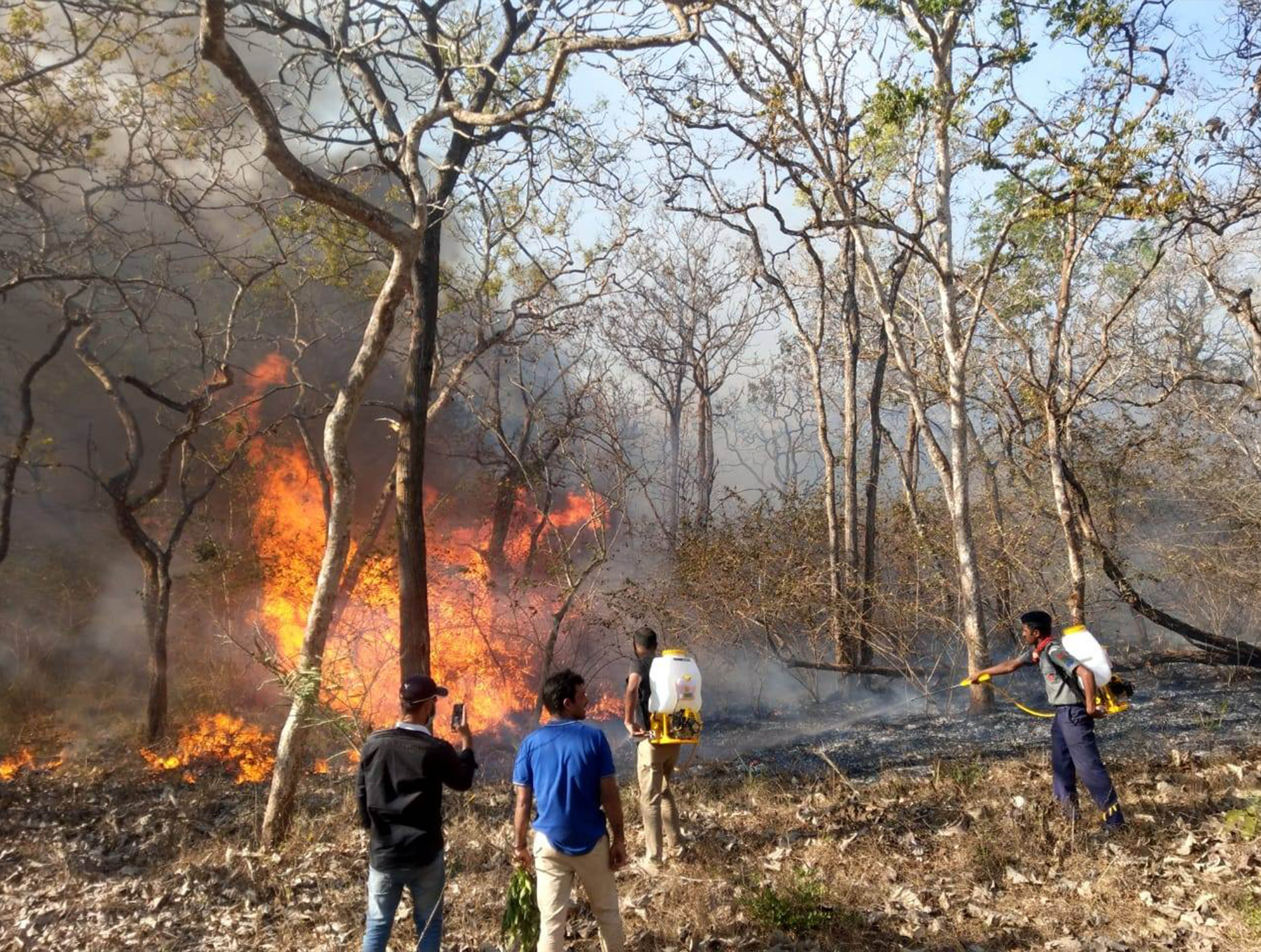
Forest department crew and local people helping to douse the Bandipur forest fire on 24 February 2019.

Two Mi-17 Indian Air Force helicopters were deployed on 25 February 2019 afternoon to douse the fire, which had been raging for three days in the Bandipur Tiger Reserve. The operation on 25 February 2019 was primarily limited to the Gopalaswamy Hills Range in Karnataka's Chamarajanagar district. The other two ranges that were seriously affected were Kundakere and Bandipur. The helicopters were deployed after Karnataka state Chief Minister HD Kumaraswamy called on the Indian Air Force for help. One proceeded towards Karadikal hill ranges while the other fought fires in the general area of Chammana halla top.

Bolagudda and Kanive temple area were also subject to helicopter fire control. A total of 10 sorties were flown, dropping approximately 30,000 litres of water.

== Damage assessment ==
Sentinel-2 Satellite images of the wildfire affected area

Satellite images shown the extent of the damage caused by the wildfire. The National Remote Sensing Centre of the Indian Space Research Organisation (ISRO), Hyderabad, released a report based on Sentinel-2 satellite data, which reported that 15,443.27 acres of forest area damaged by the fire between 23 February 2019 and 25 February 2019 in Bandipur forest region alone. Nature Conservation Foundation's Wildlife Scientist Mysore Doreswamy Madhusudan estimated that 17,000 acres would have been affected since the National Remote Sensing Centre excluded the damage in administratively part of Bandipur (Revenue land).

The number of casualties due to fire has not estimated yet. Wildlife officials say that small animals, reptiles, which are slow-moving, would have borne the brunt, while bigger mammals like leopards and tigers would have fled to the Bandipur Tiger Reserve and taken refuge in nearby areas.

== Investigation ==
Karnataka's top forest official confirmed that an "act of sabotage" had caused the blaze. Forest officials have arrested two shepherds for allegedly setting fire to the forest. Fearing tiger attacks on their cattle in Bandipur, on 22 February 2019 they had sparked the fire to chase away a tiger which was spotted in the area for a month or so, leading to massive fire, which destroyed thousands of acres of Bandipur forest area. The accused were booked under Indian section 27, 29, 30, 31, 40, 50 and 51 of the Wildlife Protection Act, 1972.

== Gallery ==
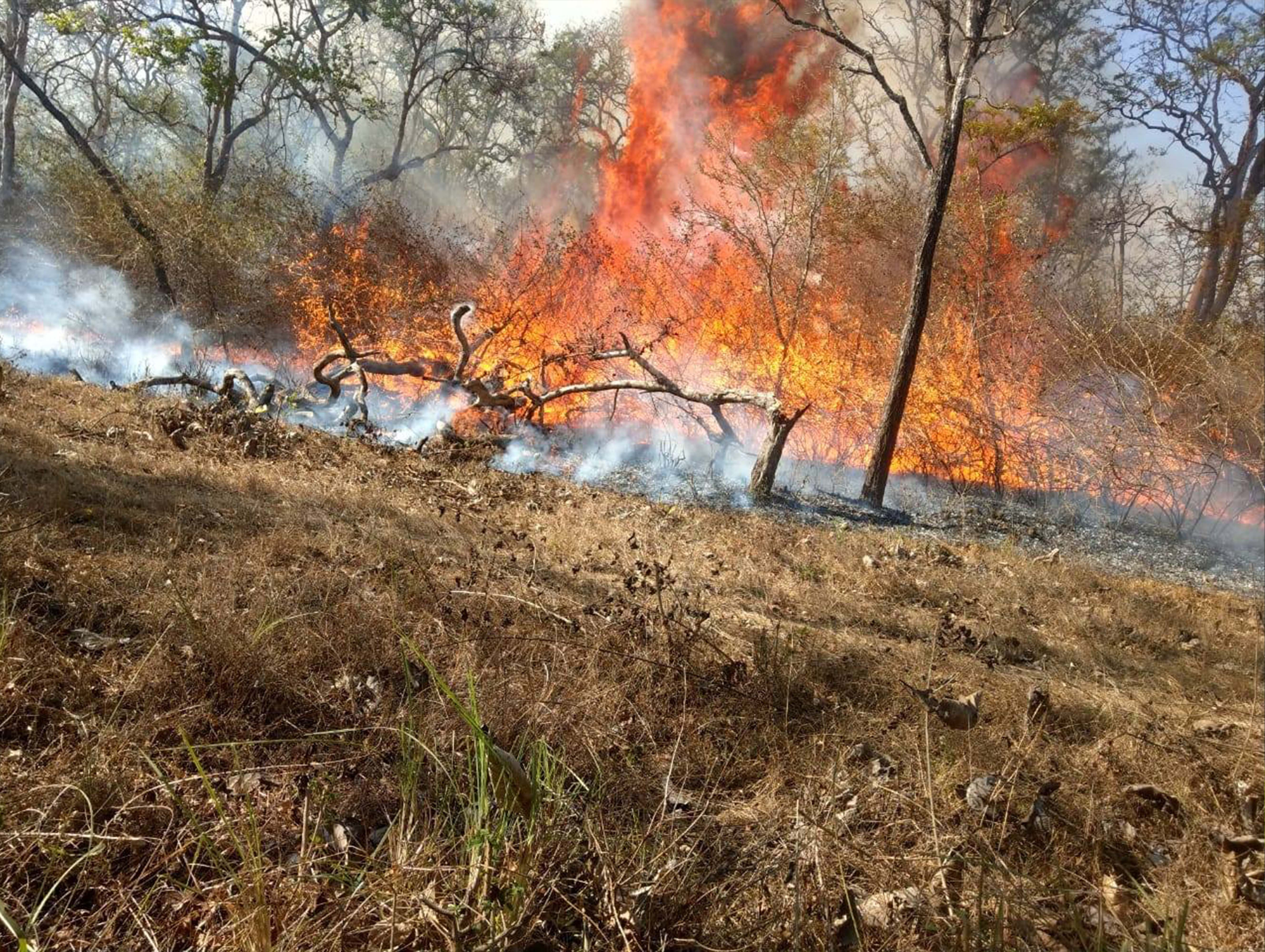
Forest fire spreading across the forest region due to dry grass

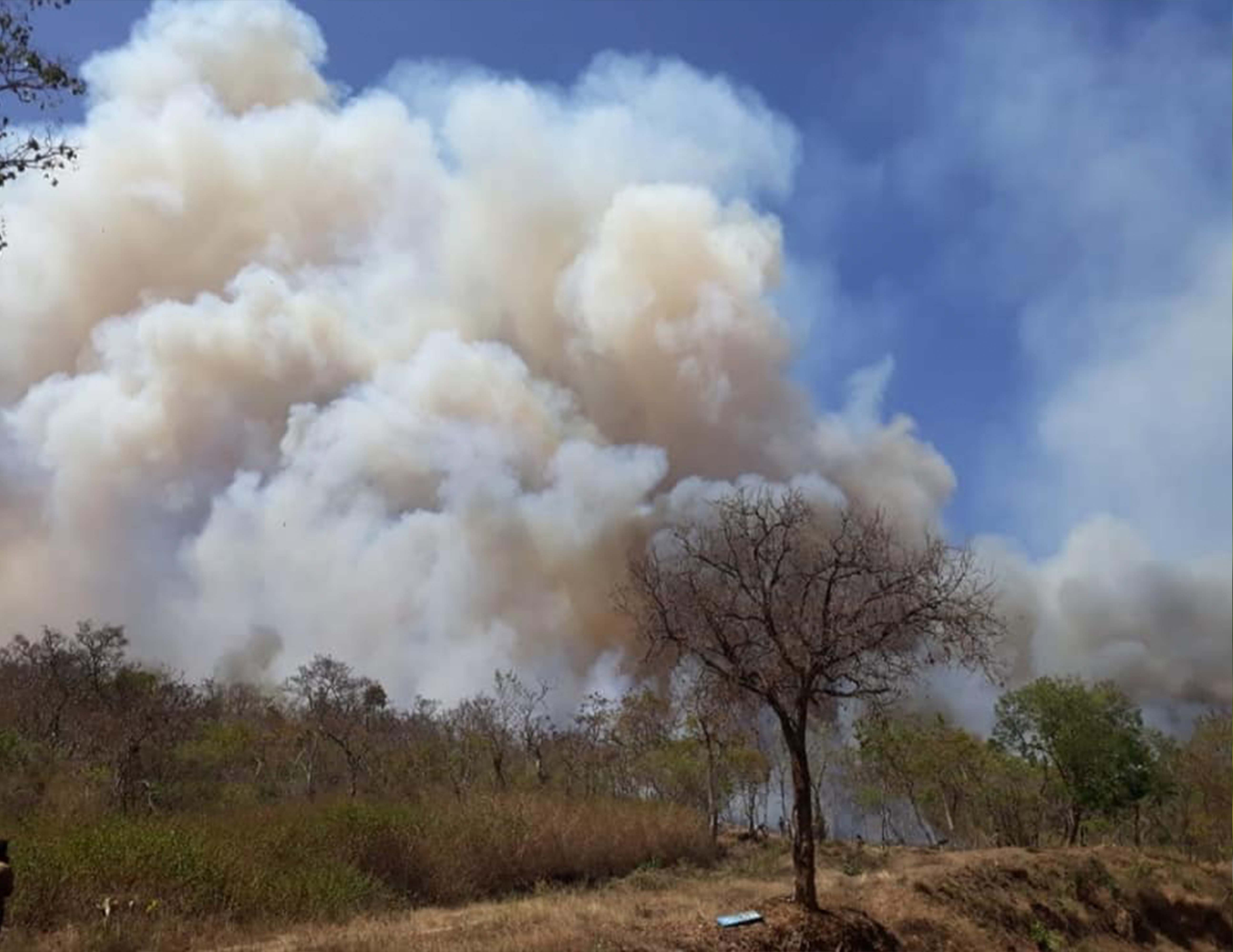
Smoke coming out of Bandipur Forest area in February 2019

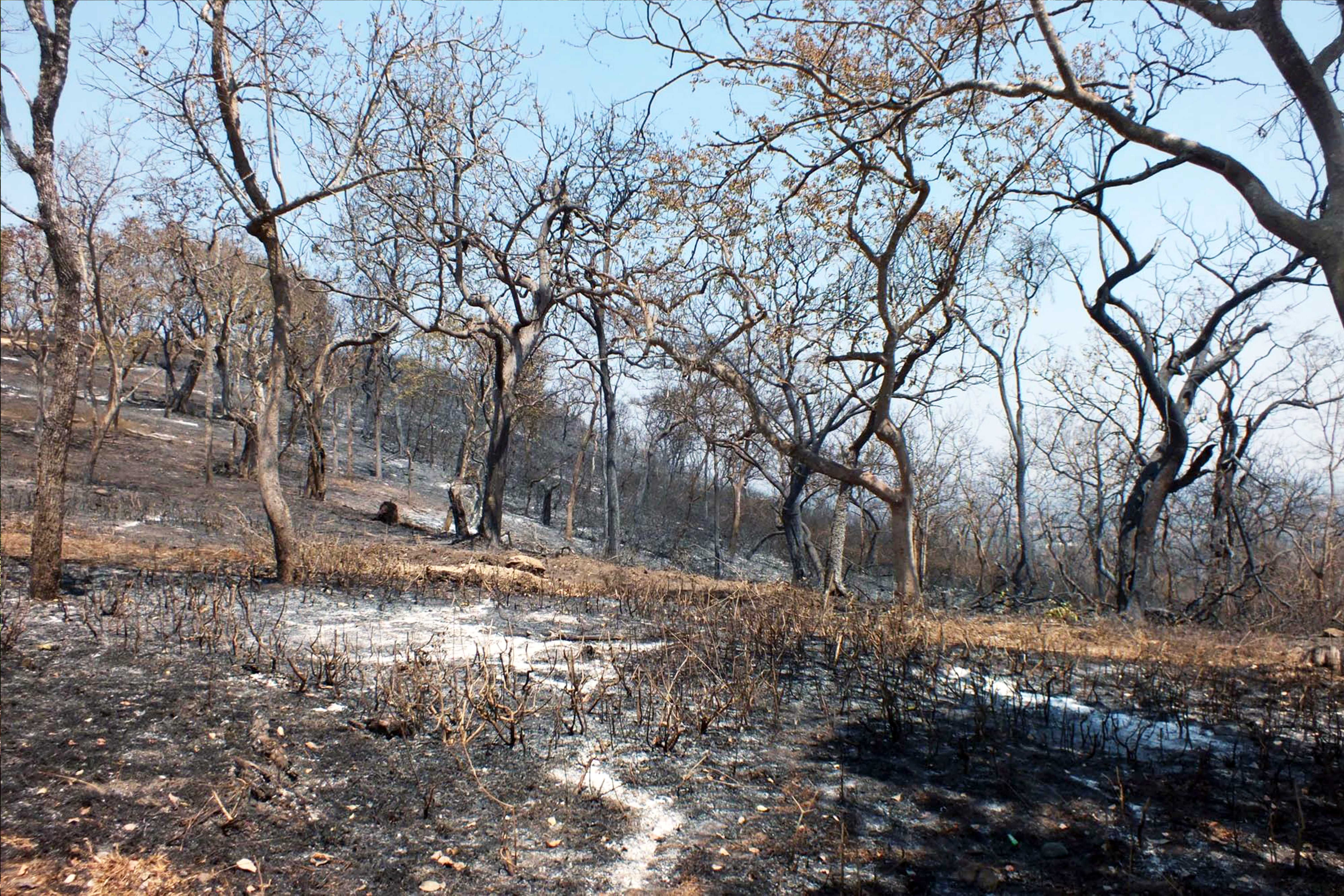
Burnt Region of Bandipur Forest in February 2019

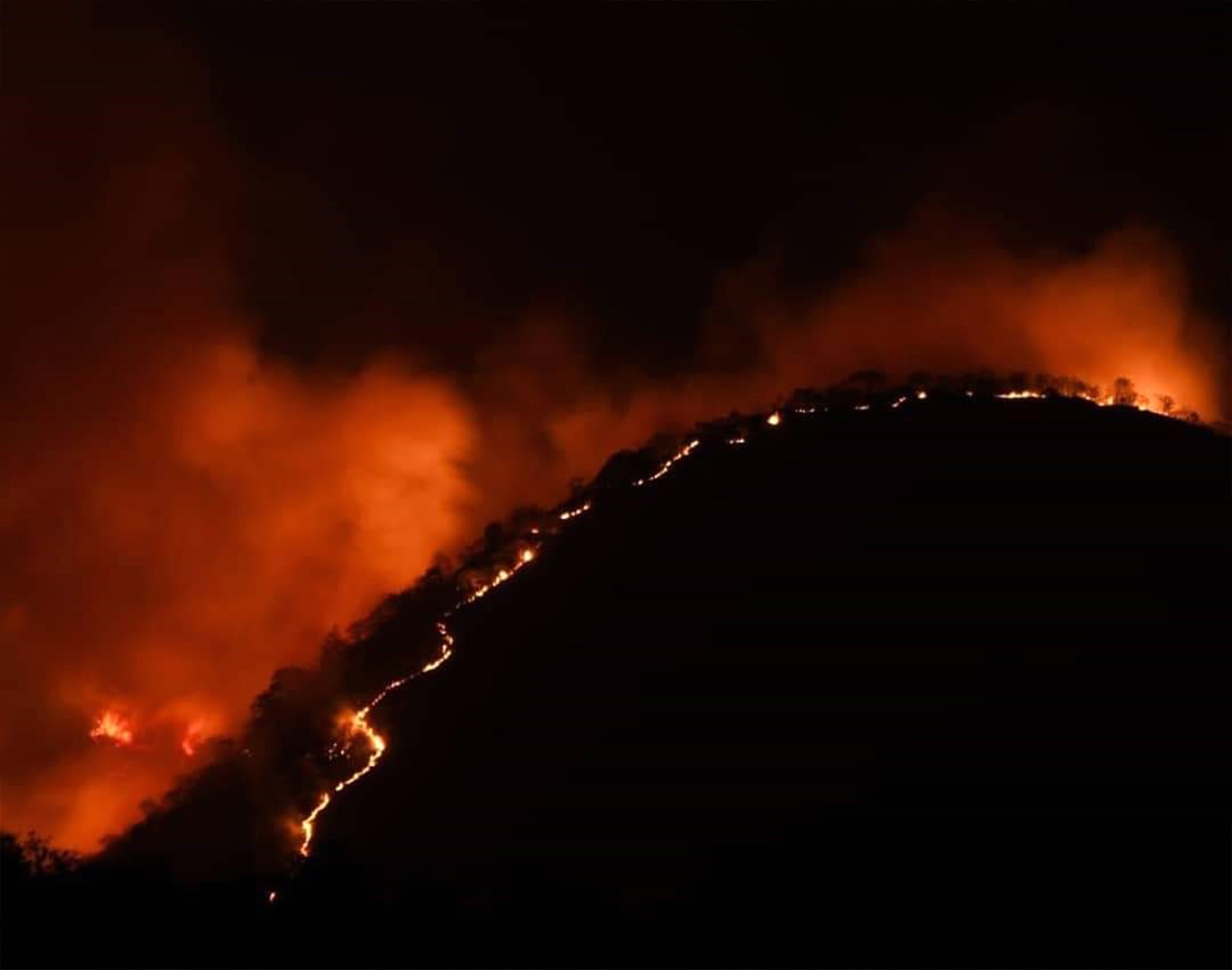
Massive Bandipur forest fires burning across GS hills region

Bandipr Forest Fire satellite image taken by NASA's VIIRS sensor

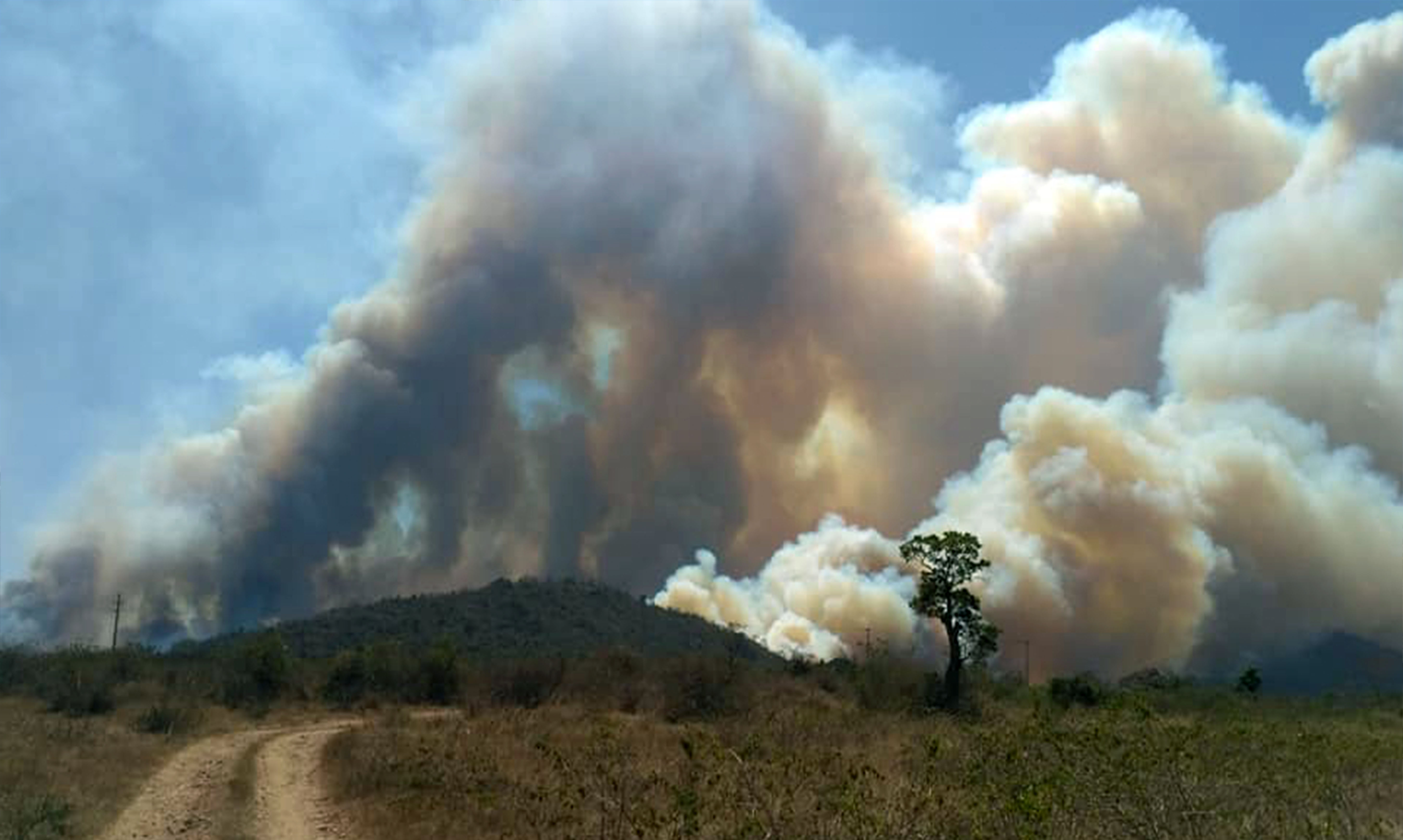
Large smoke can be seen from distance due Bandipur forest fire

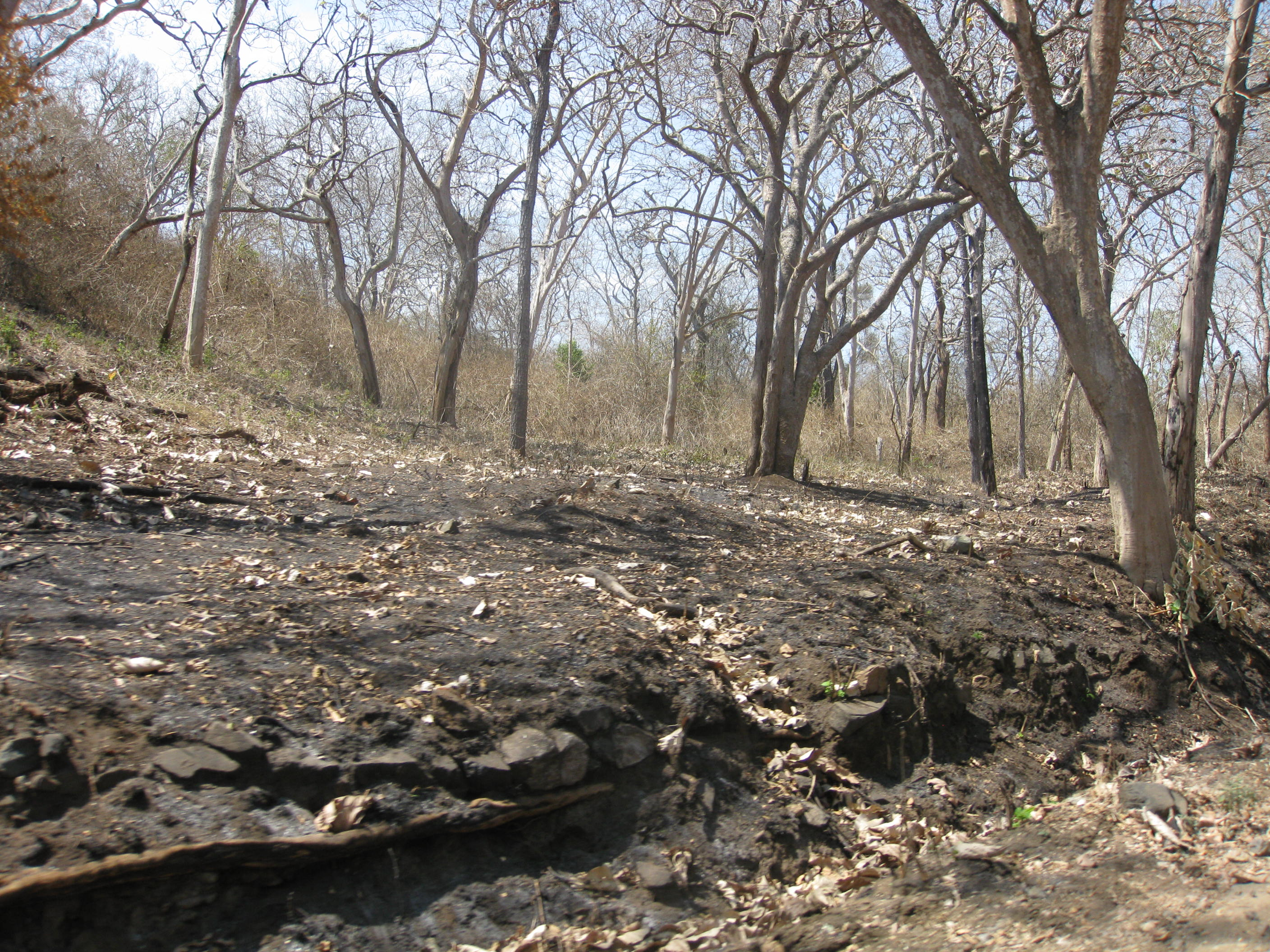
The effect forest fire that spread to Mudumalai destroying over 40 acres

== See also ==
- List of wildfires
- 2016 Uttarakhand forest fires
