= 2023 Tenerife wildfire =

Natural disaster in the Canary Islands

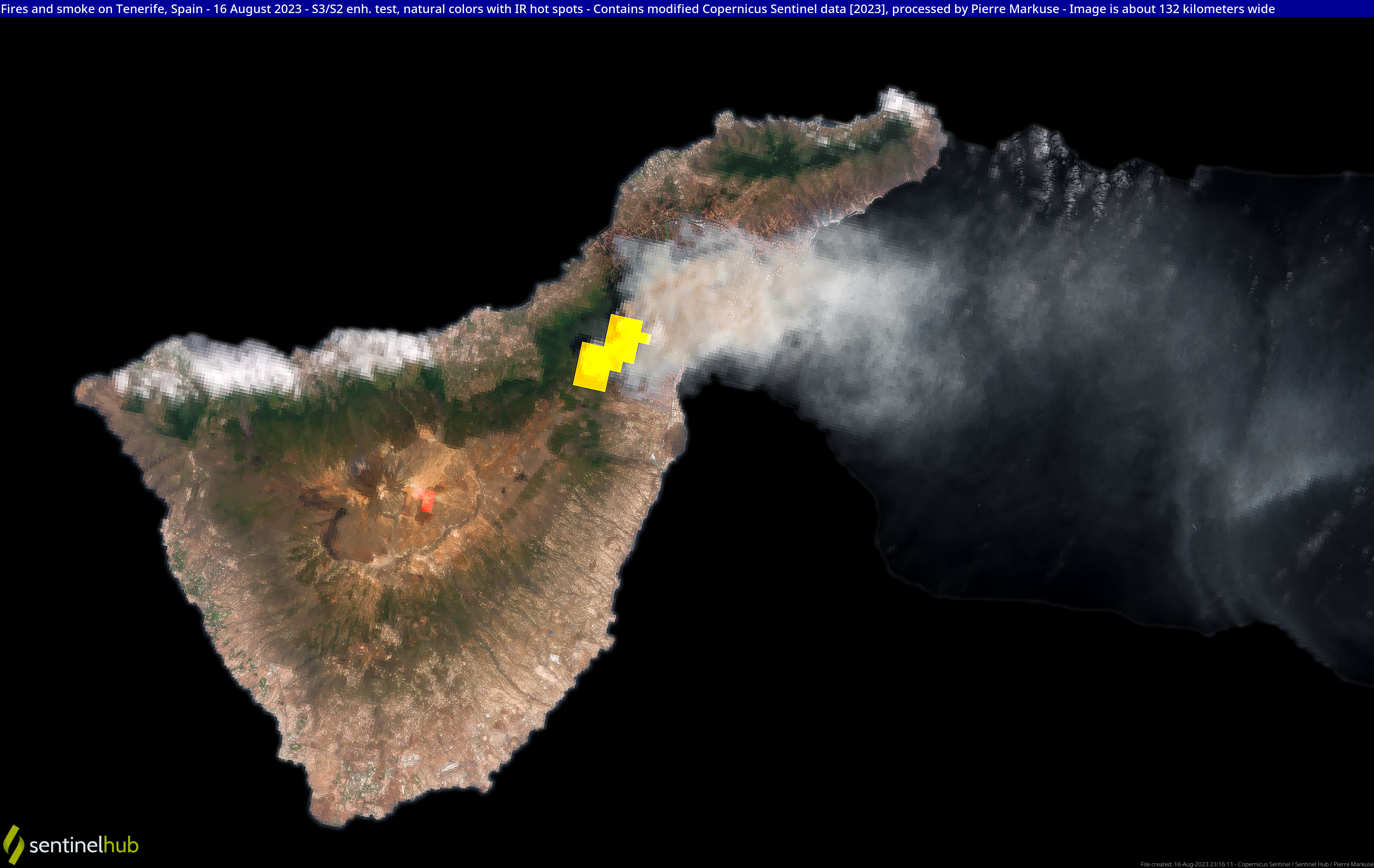
- Satellite photography of the island of Tenerife where you can see the column of smoke from the fire.
- Date: 15 August 2023–10 November 2023
- Location: Spain; In the island of Tenerife

Statistics
- Total area: 15,000 hectares (37,000 acres)

Ignition
- Cause: suspected arson

On 15 August 2023, a forest fire broke out on the island of Tenerife, in the Canary Islands of Spain. The fire, driven by the wind, heat, and low humidity levels, caused mass evacuations, widespread damage to the island's flora and fauna, as well as power and water supply cuts in some of the affected municipalities.

Within three days, the fire would enter its "sixth generation" due to its great intensity and highly destructive power. It is also the worst fire the Canary Islands have suffered in the last 40 years and the worst fire in Spain in 2023.

== Events ==
The fire originated on the night of 15 August, in the highlands of the municipality of Arafo, quickly spreading to the neighboring municipality of Candelaria. Precisely, that day was celebrated in the latter municipality the main acts of the day of the Virgin of Candelaria, the patron saint of the Canary Islands.

The following day, the fire had already crossed the Dorsal mountain range and entered the north of the island through the municipality of Santa Úrsula. The row of smoke chimneys covered several kilometers, opening different fronts. Later it would enter the municipality of La Victoria de Acentejo and other northern municipalities. Due to the direction of the wind, the cloud of smoke and ash spread over the metropolitan area of the island, even forcing the closure of the Parque Marítimo César Manrique in Santa Cruz de Tenerife, due to the repeated fall of ash.

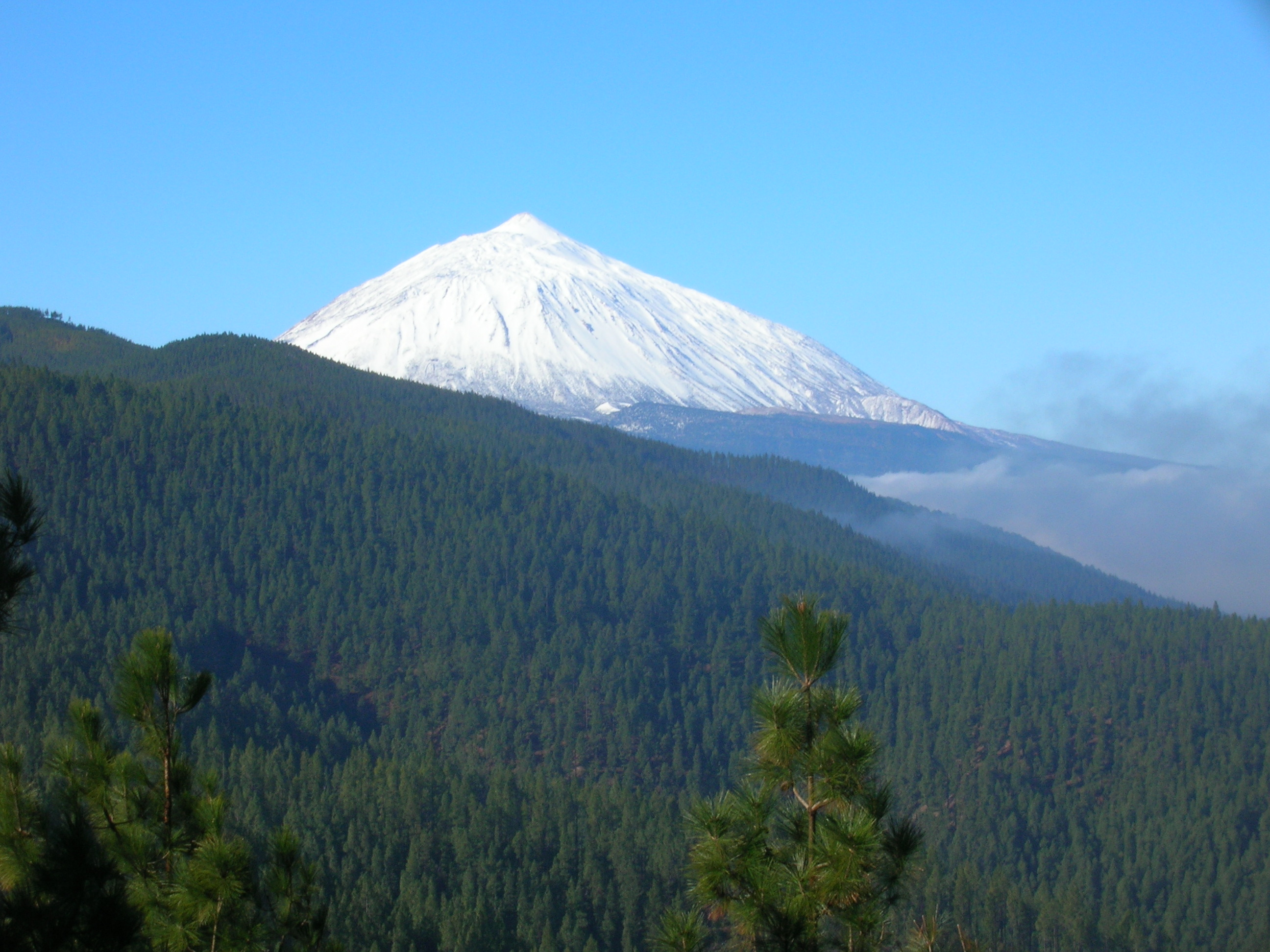
Pine forest of the Dorsal Mountain Range of Tenerife, before the fire, with Teide in the background.

By 18 August, the fire has spread through 11 municipalities, has consumed an area of more than 5,000 hectares and close to a perimeter of 50 km (31 mi) in Arafo, Candelaria, El Rosario, La Victoria de Acentejo, La Matanza de Acentejo, Tacoronte, Santa Úrsula, El Sauzal, La Orotava, Los Realejos and Güímar. On 19 August, more than 26,000 people had been evacuated and taken to shelters specially established by the affected municipalities. Also that day, the fire entered the Teide National Park.

By Sunday, 20 August, the fire already affected 10,000 hectares, with a perimeter of 70 kilometers with a large front in the north of the island, although with more favorable weather conditions than in previous days. More than 300 troops were dispatched fighting against the fire, which that night caused the evacuation of more than 12,200 people from 11 different municipalities.

On 21 August, the fire entered the municipality of Fasnia, thus becoming the 12th affected municipality. Likewise, the flames reached the vicinity of the Teide Observatory telescopes, although there was no material damage to them. By that day, the fire had burned 13,300 hectares in a perimeter of 90 kilometers. That day, Prime Minister, Pedro Sánchez, visited the affected areas and announced the declaration of a "catastrophic zone" for the island of Tenerife. On 22 August, a week had passed since the start of the fire, with the fire already affecting 14,624 hectares in a perimeter of 88 km (55 mi) in 12 different municipalities.

By 23 August, those who were evacuated were able to return home. Two days later, the fire was stabilized. On 11 September, the fire was considered controlled after almost a month since its start and more than 14,000 hectares burned.

On Wednesday, 4 October 2023, the fire that had not yet been put out was reactivated. It affected the municipalities of Santa Úrsula and La Orotava, affecting about 30 hectares of land and with about 3,200 residents evacuated. In subsequent days, other fronts were reactivated due to the wind and heat.

On 24 October, the Kings of Spain Felipe VI and Queen Letizia visited the area affected by the Tenerife fire. That same day the Tenerife fire was lowered to level 0 after improving weather conditions.

On Friday, 10 November 2023, the Cabildo de Tenerife officially declared the fire extinguished.

== Impact ==
The fire has had repercussions in the national and international media and political personalities in Spain expressed their wishes for a happy end to the Tenerife forest fire. The Minister of the Interior Fernando Grande-Marlaska traveled to Tenerife to see first-hand the extent of the fire. Numerous emergency units have been deployed from different Canary Islands and other parts of Spain.

== Damage ==
The affected area in each of the municipalities include:

- Arafo (44%)
- Candelaria (35%)
- Santa Úrsula (20%)
- La Victoria de Acentejo (15%)
- El Rosario (13%)
- El Sauzal (7%)
- La Orotava (5%)
- La Matanza de Acentejo (4%)
- Tacoronte (1%)

== See also ==
- List of wildfires
