= Milford Flat Fire =

2007 Utah wildfire

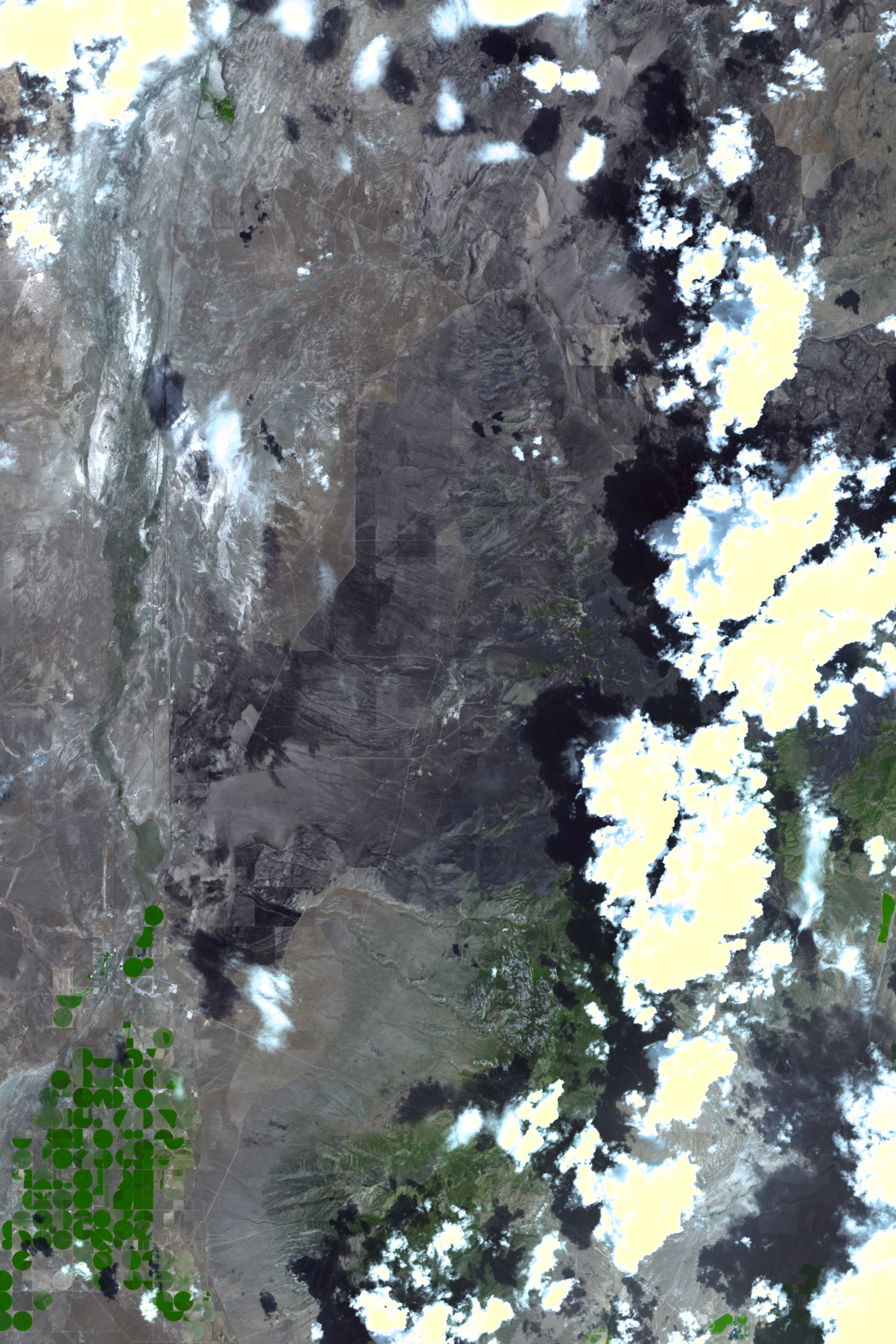
- Satellite picture of the burn scar of the Milford Flat Fire taken on July 17, 2007
- Date: July 6, 2007 – July 15, 2007
- Location: Southwest Utah
- Coordinates: 38.325°N 113.019722°W

Statistics
- Burned area: 363,052 acres (1,469.22 km^{2})

Ignition
- Cause: Lightning

Map
- Location of fire in Utah.

The Milford Flat Fire is the largest wildfire in Utah history. It was started by lightning on Friday, July 6, 2007 at 3:45 pm near Milford, Utah. The fire burned 363,052 acres (567 square miles) and caused large stretches of I-15 to be temporarily closed. Many veteran firefighters had stated this was the fastest-moving fire they had ever seen.

On Saturday, July 7, smoke caused numerous wrecks on I-15, including a 5-car pile-up, and a fatal hit-and-run that killed 2 motorcyclists from California. The fire also caused 10 truckers to abandon their cargo trailers on the side of the road. A 93-mile (150 km) stretch of I-15 was later closed. The fire crossed the freeway around Cove Fort that afternoon, causing it to be evacuated. The fire narrowly missed the local Chevron gas station, but claimed 2 garage-like structures near it, including the Dog Valley Trading Post, as well as a crew cab pickup truck left in a Park-and-Ride lot. By that evening the fire had amassed to 160,000 acres (650 km^{2}).

On Sunday, July 8, the fire slowed somewhat, reaching the 283,000-acre (1,145 km^{2}) mark by evening. The freeway was reopened, but later a 60-mile (97 km) stretch was closed for 5 hours. Also, FEMA announced the appropriation of federal funds to help fight the fire. Some evacuated residents of Cove Fort returned to view the damage.

On July 9, Firefighters were going to backburn parts of I-15, but the winds changed, and the plans were canceled. More crews arrived, bringing the total personnel from 200 to about 300 firefighters. By the end of the day, the fire had grown to 311,000 acres (1,259 km^{2}), but was 10% contained.

On July 15 the fire was contained at 363,052 acres (1,469.22 km^{2}).

Perimeter of the Milford Flat Fire one day after containment.

== See also ==
- Wildfire
- List of forest fires
- Milford, Utah
