= 2024 Colombia wildfires =

- Date: January 2024
- Location: Colombia

In January 2024, a series of more than 340 forest fires began in Colombia, burning 900 m (3,000 ft) of residential areas and affecting 174 municipalities in the country. Bogotá was affected by the fire in the Eastern Hills.

== Events ==
President Gustavo Petro said Wednesday that he would declare the forest fires a natural disaster and a state of emergency, freeing up funds to fight the fires.

On 26 January 2024, 138 flights at El Dorado International Airport were affected and returned to normal the next day and police arrested 26 people for "fire-related crimes." The Minister of the Environment, Susana Muhamad warned that the country was at serious risk of suffering forest fires that could worsen deforestation. Nearly half of the 2 trillion peso ($508 million) budget to address problems caused by El Niño, such as fighting fires, has already been spent, according to the report.

In the Berlin moorland under the jurisdiction of Tona Santander, around 50 hectares of vegetation, mainly frailejones, were consumed, putting the department's water supply in check, which lasted a week of intense fires that destroyed almost the entire moorland due to high temperatures and man-made burning.
