= 2021 France wildfires =

Series of fires in France

- Date: August 2021
- Location: Provence-Alpes-Côte d'Azur, France

Impacts
- Deaths: 2
- Cost: >100 million euros

Ignition
- Cause: Organized arson

The 2021 France wildfires were multiple wildfires that occurred in Provence-Alpes-Côte d'Azur, France, mainly in Saint Tropez. Two people died during the fires.

== Timeline ==
=== August ===
On 17 August 2021, a devastating forest fire broke out, with a flame as high as 20 meters, in Provence-Alpes-Côte d'Azur near Saint-Tropez. Thousands of people were evacuated, in particular the villages around Cavalaire, Saint-Tropez, Grimaud and La Môle were evacuated. The Var prefecture also confirmed the evacuation of several campsites and urged people to avoid the roads adjacent to the Gulf of Saint-Tropez so as not to hinder rescue. About 750 firefighters are fighting the fires that destroyed a wooded area of 3,500 hectares.
