= 2020 Delta del Paraná wildfires =

Wildfire in Argentina

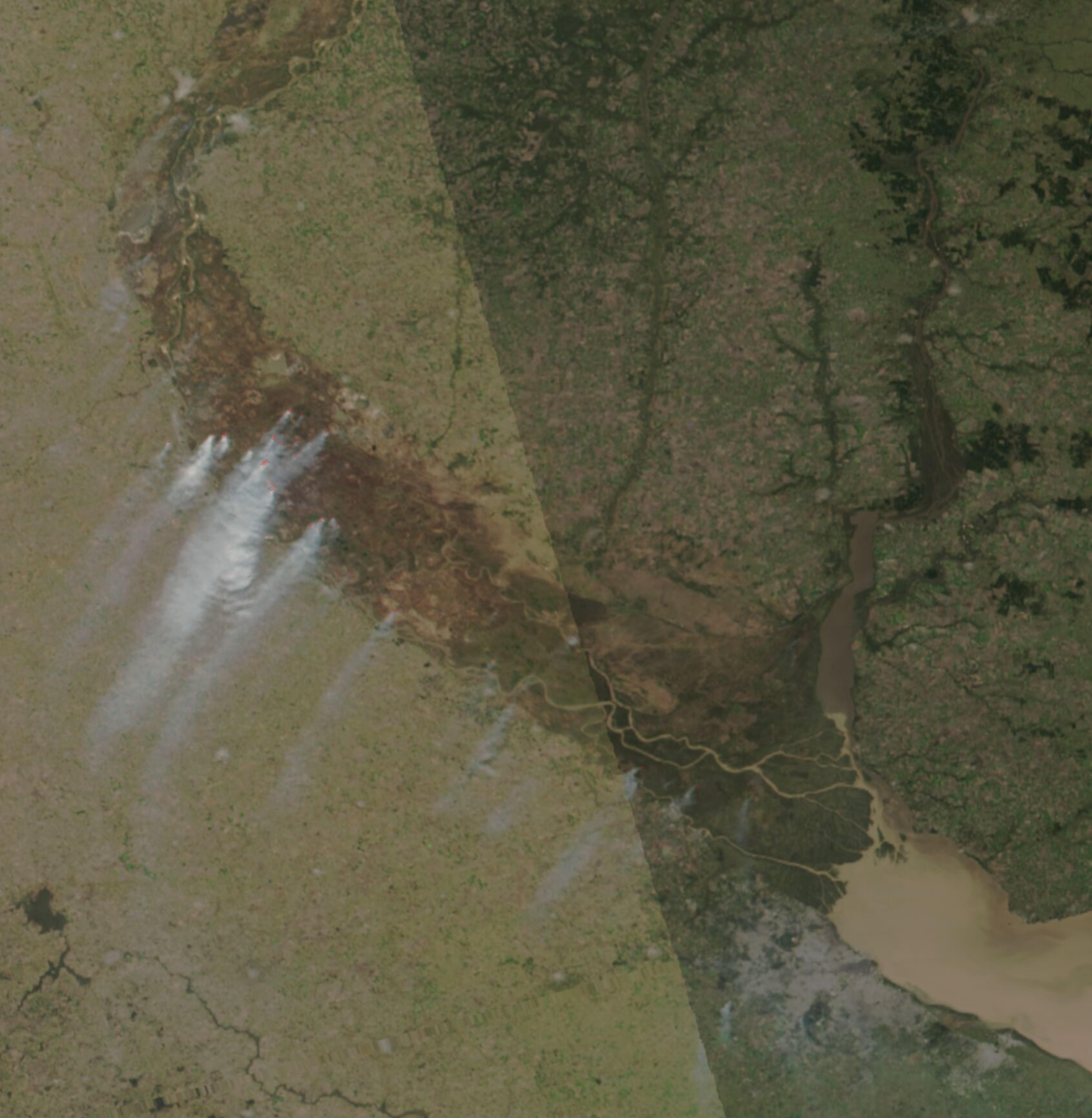
- NASA satellite imagery showing fires as of 14 June 2020
- Location: Delta del Paraná, Argentina

Statistics
- Total area: 90,000 hectares (220,000 acres)

The 2020 Delta del Paraná wildfires is a series of wildfires that are burning across the Delta del Paraná in Argentina, affecting mainly the Entre Ríos and Santa Fe provinces, but also Buenos Aires, including major cities as Rosario.

The first outbreaks were detected in February 2020, and new ones keep emerging until August 2020 at least. Previously, this same area had suffered the 2008 Delta del Paraná wildfires.

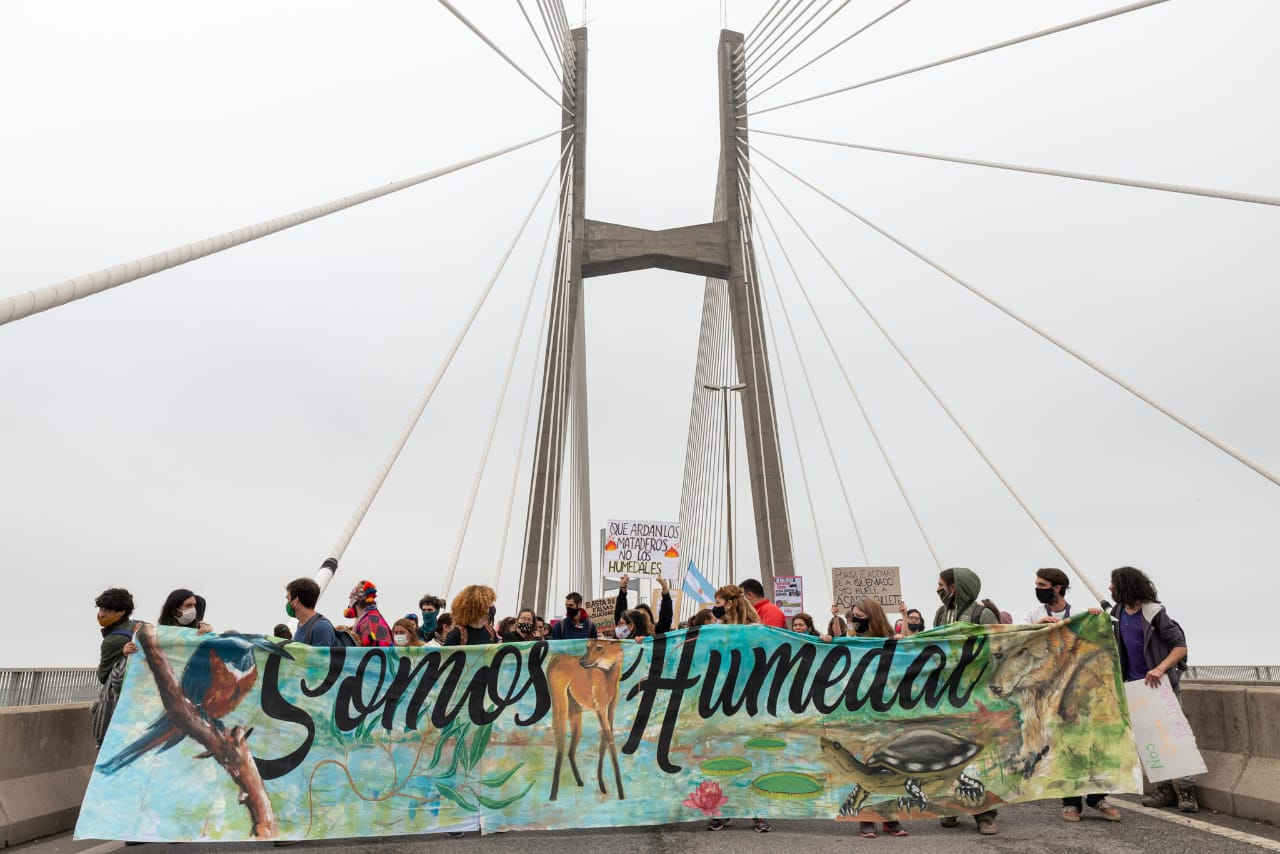
Demonstrations in the Rosario-Victoria Bridge (August 2020)

As of August 2020, 90,000 hectares (220,000 acres) had burned, in over 8,000 detected fires. A 10 million pesos (US$137,934) daily cost was estimated.

== Context ==
During the first months of 2020, the Río de la Plata river basin received an unusually low amount of rain, including the Iguazú and Paraguay rivers. This even caused the Iguazú Falls to dry for a time, what created a diplomatic conflict between Argentina and Brazil, over the several dams the country operates in the northern area of the basin. Brazil ultimately decided to open the floodgates of the dam for 12 days on 18 May 2020.

This drought, which conjugated with the La Niña phenomenon, brought an historical low for the Paraná river level (the lowest level in 51 years). Every watercourse in the De la Plata river basin registered very low levels and droughts, caused by rainfall anomalies in the northern area of the basin.

This low water level caused several problems, including trouble for big ships to navigate and export the harvest, water intakes in several cities unable to soak any water, and a big fish mortality. It also made several environment-harming activities easier, such as illegal fishing and hunting, activities which in some cases involve engaging in illegal fires as well.

But mainly, this lack of rainfalls caused a drought in the Delta del Paraná, and a lack of moisture in its abundant available plant biomass that stimulates the start and fast expansion of fires.

== Causes ==
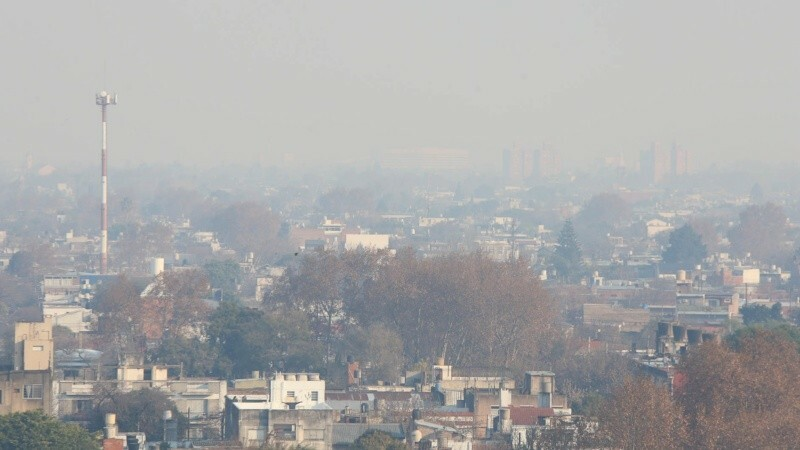
Smoke in the City of Rosario, July 2020

During the summer, it was thought that the fires could be caused by people putting out cigarettes or leaving bonfires lit while on the Delta del Paraná islands, as well as by cattle ranchers trying to gain terrain.

Meanwhile, during 2020 farmers and ranchers in Argentina were subject of several kinds of sabotages, including silobolsas being shattered and fields set into fire. The agricultural sector pointed that the fires were a consequence of the higher amount of public visiting the islands (both tourists and poachers), the high number of available plant biomass, and even some political intentionality, linked to the sabotaged suffered by them during the year. Also, ranchers explained that it would be of no use for them to set their ranches on fire (which account for about 20 or 30% of the islands area, the rest being public lands), since soybean prices didn't make farming on the Delta attractive, and the fires damage the land for its use for livestock grazing.

Criminal charges were brought against several ranchers.

On the other hand, several Environmental organizations pointed that the fires were started by ranchers to renew graze, as they do every year, but with the difference that in 2020 the drought made those fires bigger and easier to grow, which caused the shift so rapidly. The government credited this theory, blaming the fires on ranchers.
