= 2022 Araucanía wildfires =

Series of wildfires in Araucanía, Chile

Location of Araucanía Region.

The 2022 Araucanías wildfires are a series of wildfires in the Chilean region of Araucanía. By February 26 57,000 ha had been burnt by fires. The commune of Traiguén and China Muerta National Reserve were on February 26 the places were most resources being used to fight fires. By February 25 180 haa had been consumed in China Muerta and the fire had not yet reached Conguillío National Park.

According to Aída Baldini, manager of the wildfire division of the National Forest Corporation, many fires in Araucanía are intentional given that firefighters are often hindered to approach the fires. This hindrance is in some cases a large tree that has been felled over a road, or by firefighting personnel being threatened at gunpoint.

== See also ==
- Mapuche conflict
