= 2008 Delta del Paraná wildfires =

Series of wildfires in Argentina

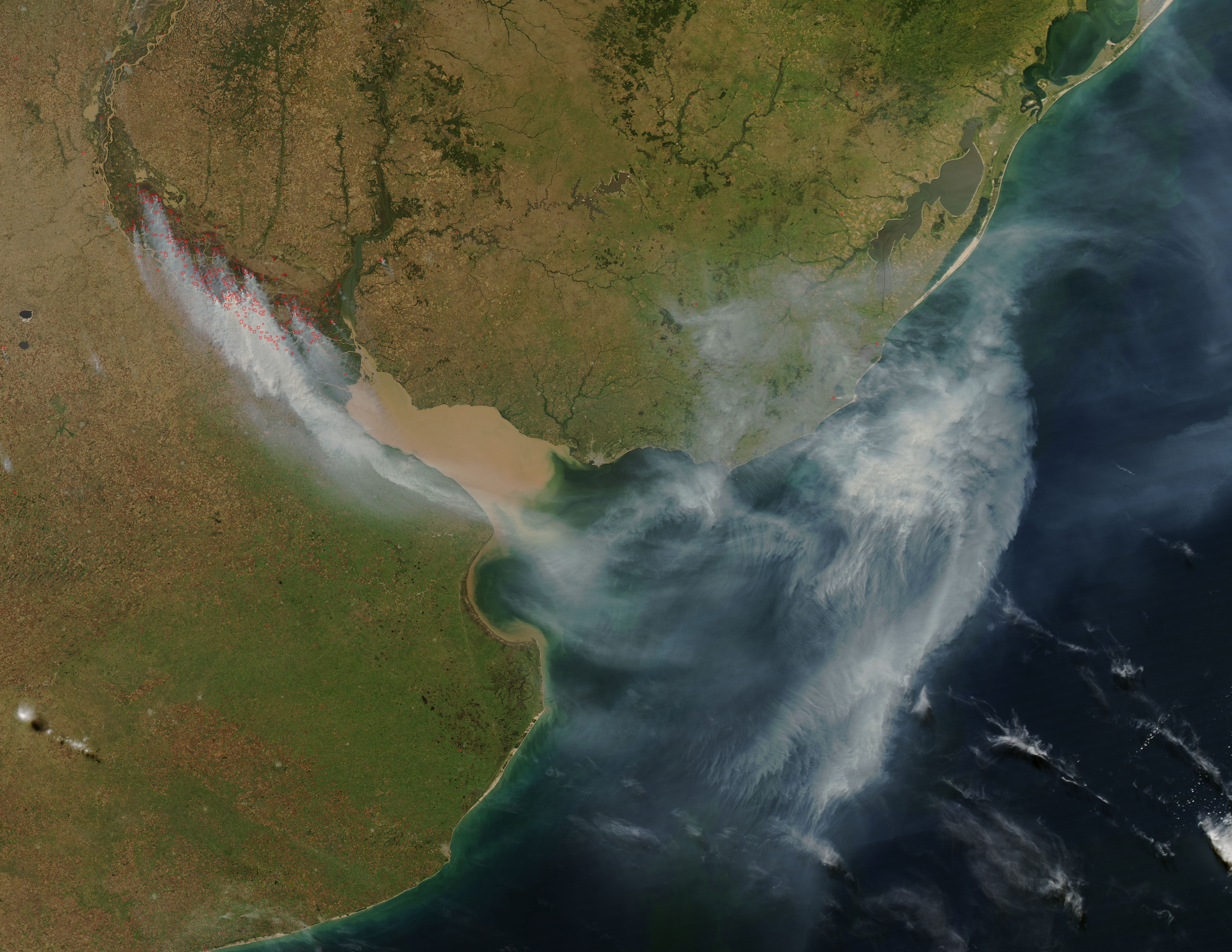
- Satellite view of the fires captured by NASA on April 18, 2008. Smoke is shown covering the cities of Rosario, Buenos Aires and even parts of Uruguay. Fires are marked as red points
- Date: April 2008
- Location: Delta del Paraná, Argentina

Statistics
- Total area: 172,974 acres (70,000 ha)

The 2008 Delta del Paraná wildfires were a series of wildfires in the Delta del Paraná islands located mainly in Entre Ríos, Argentina. It was an unprecedented event that covered major cities as Buenos Aires and Rosario in smoke, affecting the health of millions of people. The first fires were detected on 13 April 2008, and lasted until April 25 – 26, when rain extinguished most of them. Buenos Aires was heavily affected between April 15 and April 20.

Intentional fires started in April 2008, following the purpose of burning grasslands to adapt the De la Plata Basin wetlands land for a livestock grazing use. However, the drought that this area was experiencing that year turned this fires unmanageable, hitting 172,974 acres (70,000 ha).

The cloud of smoke that followed the fires caused the worst air pollution in Argentinean history, reaching even Montevideo, Uruguay and forcing airport and highway closures. A significant increase in ocular symptoms and bulbar conjunctival hyperemia, as well as tear film instability was also proven.

The fires happened again in 2020, with the 2020 Delta del Paraná wildfires.

== Location ==
The fires were located in the Paraná Delta islands, part of the Río de la Plata Basin, which ranges from the Entre Ríos to Buenos Aires provinces in Argentina, comprising over 380,000 ha.

== Context ==
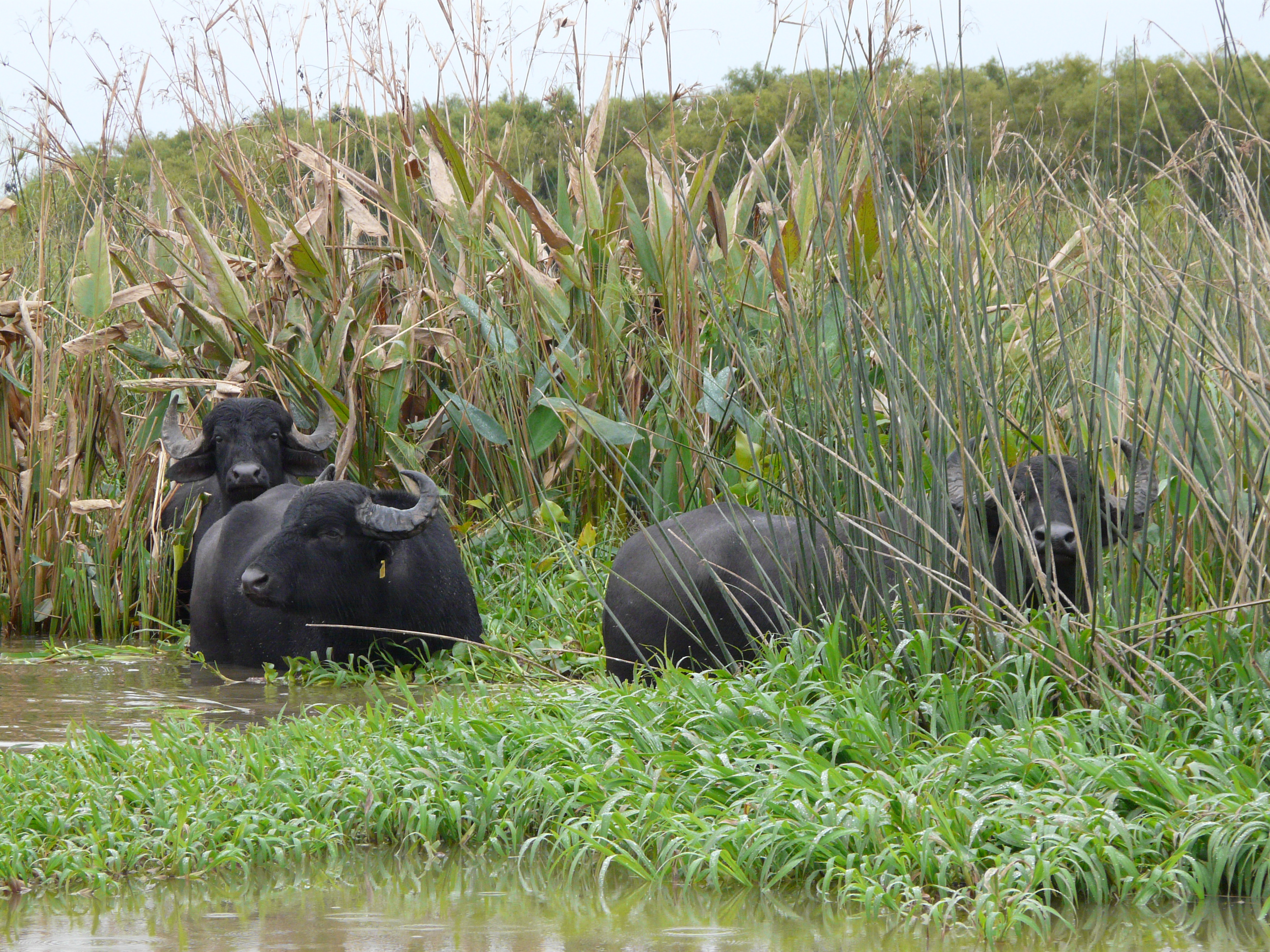
Buffalos in the Delta del Paraná

In many areas of the world, including Argentina, burning grasslands is a historical procedure to renew the grass. In Argentina, the increase of the soybean price caused the mainland farms (with a better soil) to switch from the more traditional livestock raising activity to soybean farming, displacing the cattle to the less-suitable lands of the Delta islands (its cattleheads raised from 160,000 in 1997 to 1,500,000 in 2007).

However, the rancher's controlled fires (which are not as frequent during autumn -April on the summer hemisphere- as they are in Spring) are not the only weighting factor of this disaster. A mix of unusual drought and winds contributed to the big scale of the uncontrolled fires.

Meanwhile, the government of Argentina was on a fierce confrontation against the rural sector, which lasted about 129 days.

== Chronology ==
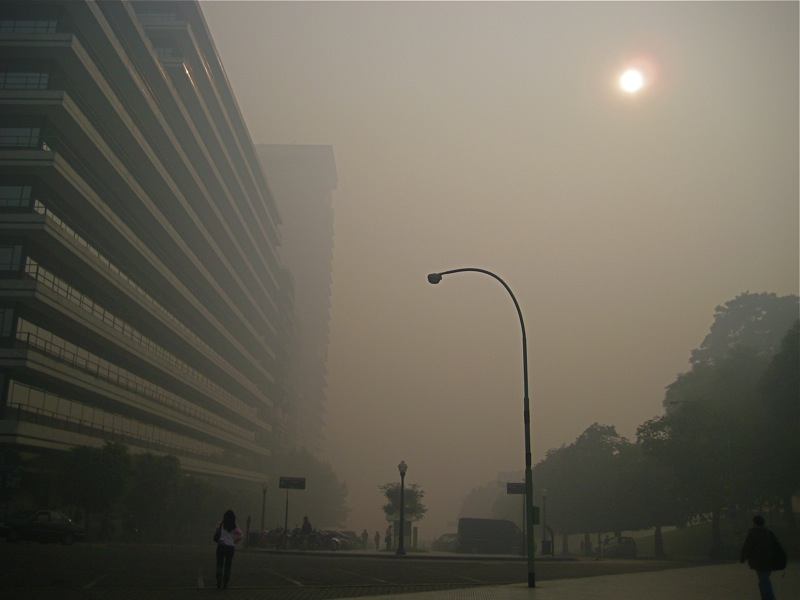
Smoke in Buenos Aires

The fires were first detected on April 13, 2008 in a lower scale, and worsening from April 15, 2008 The National Agricultural Technology Institute registered 570 fires and a 172,974 acres (70,000 ha) affected area.

By April 14, three fires had burnt 10,000 ha and 200 firemen were working to extinguish them.

On April 17, then-president Cristina Kirchner made its first public appearance since the fires started, criticizing the irresponsibility behind the fires and saying they reminded her of the 1991 Hudson vulcano eruption. The Environment Secretary requested the public to report fires, to speed up the investigation. That same day, several accidents related to the smoke in highways caused several deaths.

On April 19, Buenos Aires was experiencing eight times more Carbon dioxide than usual (17 ppm), and a twelve times higher amount of ashes in the air. A yellow alert was raised on hospitals (the number of consultations for trouble breathing were 30% higher than normal, 300 people had to be hospitalized), a Subway line was closed, the Buenos Aires city airport closed, and several schools suspended classes. Pharmacies ran out of face masks in a day. Meanwhile, in Zarate (Buenos Aires province), over 200 firemen were trying to extinguish over 300 fires.

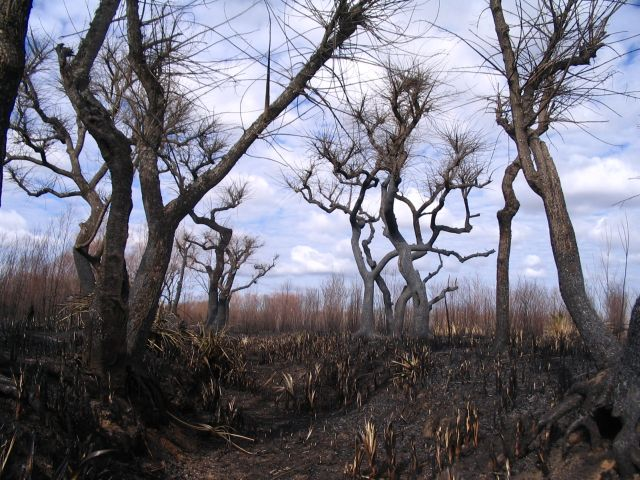
Burnt area

The Ministry of Interior, Florencio Randazzo, raised criminal charges to 160 ranchers.

On April 20, the president made a helicopter flight over the fires, calling the 297 active ones at that date as intentional. Three suspects were arrested for questioning, along with other six persons of interest.

By April 22, highway crashes caused by the fires' smoke had led to 9 deaths and 40 injured people.
