= 2016 Javea forest fire =

2016 forest fire

The 2016 Javea forest fire was a forest fire which occurred in Spain in early September 2016 near Javéa and Benitachell around 50 km north of Benidorm, burnt more than 800 hectares and destroyed at least twenty homes in the area between Granadella and Javea. Authorities later stated it was likely to have been started deliberately.

== Cause ==
Although the fire started on one of the hottest recorded days of the year, multiple news outlets reported the possibility of arson attacks, and Valencia emergency service officials stated concerns that the fire could have been started deliberately.

== Response ==
Officials at the time stated more than 200 firefighters had to be deployed to tackle the fire, supported by firefighting aircraft and military units.

== Evacuations ==
More than 800 hectares burnt, and at least twenty homes were destroyed. Due to the severity of the fire and the speed with which it spread, more than 1000 people were evacuated from the Javéa area.
