= 2021 Chilean Patagonia wildfire =

2021 wildfire in Chile

The Chilean Patagonia wildfire was a wildfire affecting Patagonia Park in Aysén Region, southern Chile. The fire begun on Friday July 2, 2021 around 22:00 local time. Radio Cooperativa reported in the night of July 2, 2021 that the fire could be observed 80 km (50 mi) away in the town of Cochrane. It was expected that incoming rain would help mitigate the fire. As of July 3, 2021, 150 hectares (370 acres) have burnt. National Office of Emergency of the Interior Ministry declared the fire a "red alert" emergency on July 3, 2021. By July 7 the fire was "under control but not yet extinguished".

An investigation found out that the fire started when strong winds (120 km/h) caused the chimney flue of a stove to collapse. This happened in a centre for Darwin's rhea reproduction. Two rheas suffered injuries as a result of the fire.

== See also ==
- 2017 Chile wildfires
- Drought in Chile
