= 2024 Western Cape wildfires =

Series of forest fires in South Africa

The 2024 Western Cape wildfires were a series of forest fires in the City of Cape Town, Western Cape, South Africa. They led to the loss of 52,501 hectares of land, of which 15,587 hectares were on the CapeNature estate. 129 VIIRS fire alerts were reported between September 11, 2023, and September 16, 2024 (high confidence alerts), with 52 VIIRS fire alerts reported in 2024.

== Description ==
The typical season of forest fires in the City of Cape Town is mid-November and usually lasts 21 weeks. On January 31, 2024, the Operational Land Imager captured this false-color image of a fire burning near Pringle Bay and Betty's Bay, communities about 40 kilometres (25 mi) southeast of Cape Town. However, sensors on NASA and NOAA satellites began to detect widespread fire activity near Pringle Bay on January 29, the same day that local authorities warned people in nearby communities to prepare to evacuate. The next day, Pringle Bay's 800 residents were ordered to evacuate, and firefighters fought the blaze along the southern edge of the town.

A full evacuation was ordered for Pringle Bay, about 80 kilometres (50 mi) from Cape Town. The South African Weather Service (SAWS) issued the highest level 10 warning for veld fire conditions across central, eastern, and northern parts of the province. The fire season in the City of Cape Town began on December 1, 2023. There were a few small fires that continued till the first three weeks of January 2024, fueled by the hot, dry weather and strong coastal winds. According to Annelie Rabie, mayor of the Overstrand municipality, about six wildfires had broken out in the area. As of Jan. 30, two of the six fires remain uncontained; the fire of greatest concern was located in the Hangklip area between Pringle Bay and Betty's Bay. Later, the department was able to contain four, in Vrygrond, Masiphumelele, Broadlands, and Overcome Heights. One was heading straight for Pringle Bay.

The authorities issued a code red status due to the fire threatening homes and advised Silversands, Seafarms, and Blesberg residents to evacuate. An evacuation shelter was established at Kleinmond Town Hall. The fire was expected to spread along Brodie Link into Pringle Bay. On January 31, 2024, eight fires were burning on CapeNature land throughout the Western Cape. The first day where no fires were reported was February 7, 2024, marking a temporary end to a gruelling 15 days of firefighting by Cape Nature staff. On February 1, 2024, local authorities declared that all flare-ups were contained. Four homes were destroyed, according to news reports.

The most demanding period was between January 22 and February 15, 2024. The district suffered multiple major fires simultaneously, the most serious being the Kluitjieskraal and Brandvlei fires. These fires were triggered by extreme weather conditions, high temperatures, and strong winds, combined with the excessive fuel load provided by aged natural and alien vegetation, which made suppression operations exceptionally challenging.

=== Kluitjieskraal fire ===
On January 23, 2024, there was an ignition at Kluitjieskraal in the Wolseley area. Over the next three weeks, there were multiple ignitions throughout the Western Cape, with the concentration of conflagrations being the Boland and Whale Coast. It was one of the fires of greatest concern that had been burning since January 22 in the Kluitjieskraal area near Wolseley in the Cape Winelands District Municipality. The fire split into two fire-lines on either side of the Obiqua Mountain.

From 1 July 2023 to 30 April 30, 2024, 1,435 fires were reported to the CWDM's control room. Most veld fire ignitions occurred within the boundaries of Stellenbosch and Drakenstein, accounting for 69% of all calls. The frequency of veld fires peaked from October 2023 to April 2024.

The fires in Overcome Heights and Masiphumelele reportedly damaged dozens of informal dwellings, displacing around 250 people.

== Damage ==
In total, 52 501 hectares of land were burnt, out of which 15,587 hectares were on the CapeNature estate. As per the government reports, 95% of a nearby nature reserve had also burned.

Even though there was property damage to vineyards, orchards, water infrastructure, and fences, there were no civilian or firefighter casualties.
