= 2017 Southeast Asian haze =

Haze over the Southeast Asia region in mid-2017

The 2017 Southeast Asian Haze was a transnational haze crisis that started in late July, 2017. The Singaporean National Environment Agency said in June that the number of hotspots in Sumatra due to farmers using the "slash-and-burn" technique to clear land was 180.

== See also ==
- 2015 Southeast Asian haze
- 2013 Southeast Asian haze
