= 2016 Uttarakhand forest fires =

Wildfire in India

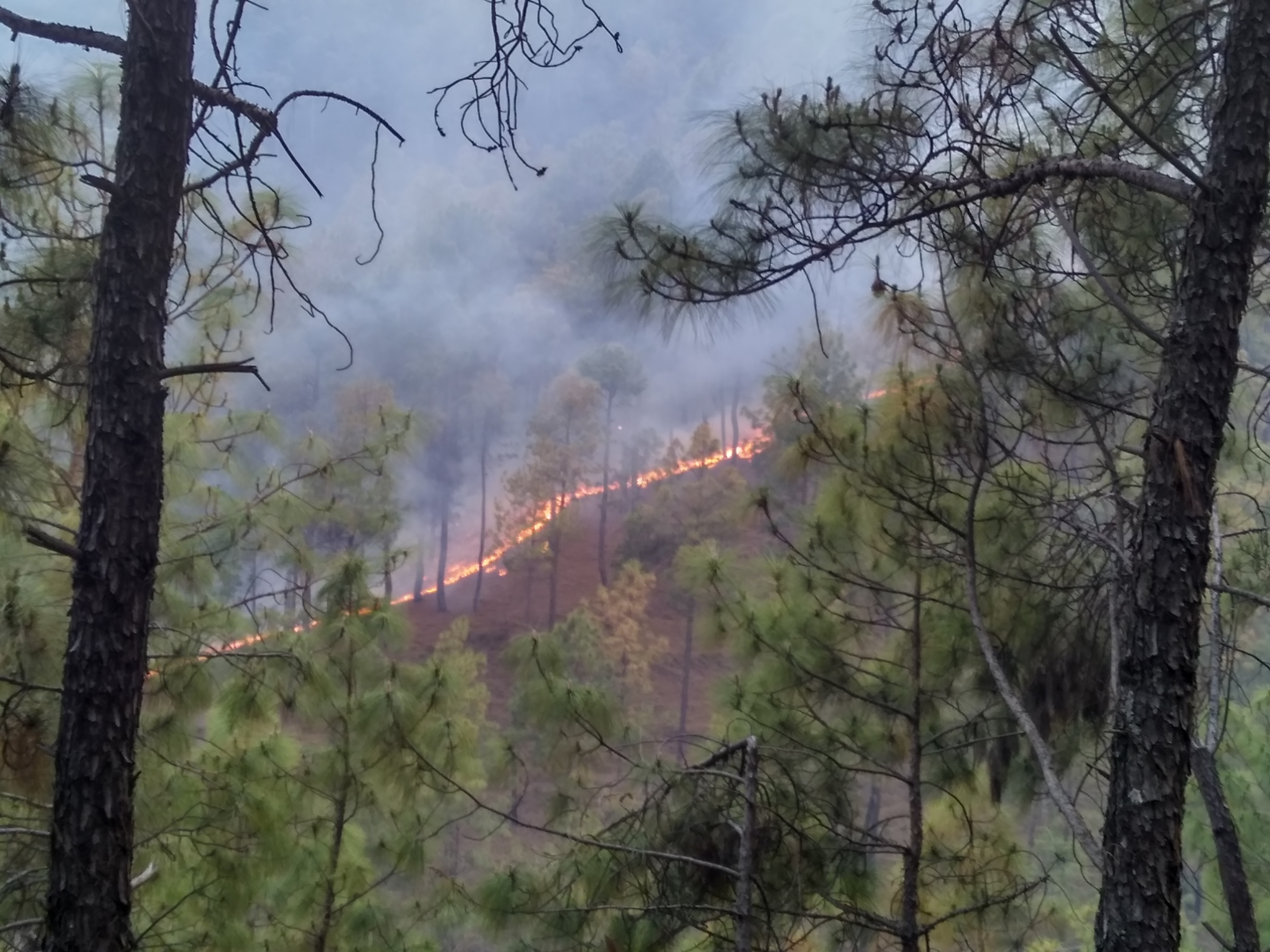
- Forest fire in Almora district of Uttarakhand state
- Date: April – May 2016
- Location: Uttarakhand and Himachal Pradesh, India

Statistics
- Total area: 4,538 hectares (11,210 acres)

Impacts
- Deaths: 9
- Injuries: 17

The state of Uttarakhand within India

The 2016 Uttarakhand forest fires were a series of widespread wildfires that took place in Uttarakhand, India, between April and May 2016. Officials detected nearly 1,600 fires, which were exacerbated by a severe heatwave and drought conditions across the region. The fires, among the worst recorded in Uttarakhand's history, burned approximately 4,538 hectares (11,210 acres) of forest land, resulted in nine fatalities, and significantly impacted local tourism and wildlife in the Jim Corbett National Park and Rajaji Tiger reserve. The fires were eventually brought under control by early May through the combined efforts of the National Disaster Response Force and Indian Air Force, aided by rainfall.

Officials detected nearly 1,600 total fires, which were brought under control by 2nd May, and as rain fell the following day, it reduced the impact of the wildfires. An initial report on 4th May noted that 3,500 hectares (8,600 acres) had been destroyed by the fire.

== History and causes ==
Forest fires caused by humans in the Himalayan state of Uttarakhand have been a regular event. Since the formation of the state in 2000, more than 44,518 hectares (110,010 acres) of forest land has been lost to fire.

Some fires during 1921, 1930, and 1942 have been associated with popular movements against the then British government's forestry policies and as a call for independence. Most of these fires occur in the chir pine (Pinus roxburghii) zone which is prone to fire.

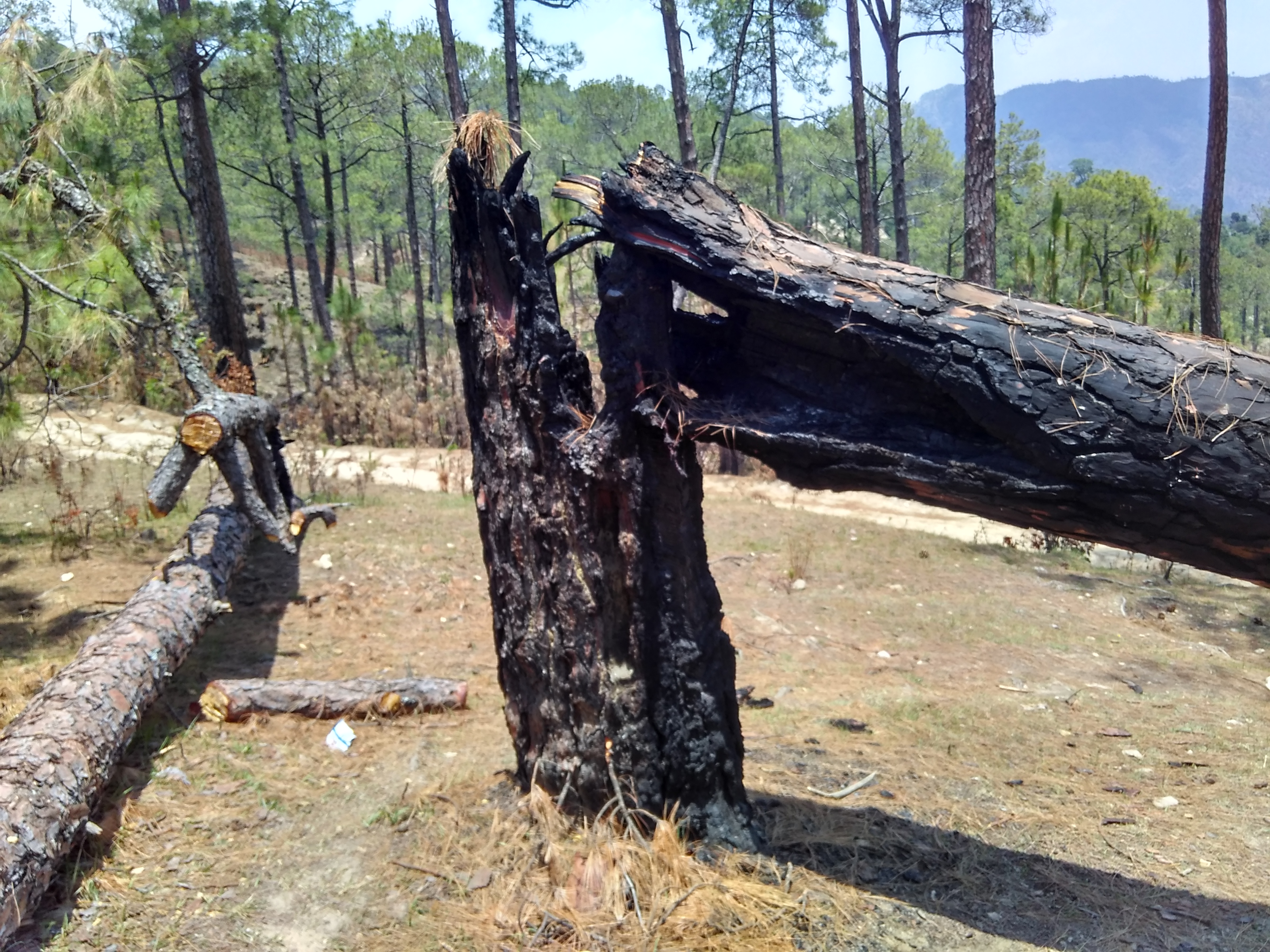
Burnt Chir Pine

But the pine itself is resistant to the fire. Instead of harming them, these fires help in their growth by reducing coverage of broad-leaf trees, which leads to an increase in the land covered by chir pine and oak. The broad-leaved forest is dominated by oak species, including Banj oak (Quercus leucotrichophora). Resin is harvested from these pines, and fires are often intentionally set to remove the carpet of pine needles that obstruct harvesting activity. In June 1981, a blanket ban was introduced against the felling of standing trees 1000 meters above sea level; a ban that prohibits the removal of pine trees in the areas where they are invading. Apart from accidental fires, several causes and motivations for setting fires have been noted which include encroachment on forest lands and concealing illegal timber extraction. Major illicit timber trade relies on pine forests since they are often used for construction.

A major cause of the fires was attributed to the record high temperatures and severe lack of rainfall due to a dry winter. The Uttarakhand forest fires also came as India suffered one of its worst droughts in years with the government noting that over 330 million people were affected by water shortages.

== Early 2016 events and controversy ==
The forest fires began on February 2, 2016, and went initially unnoticed for several weeks, while Parliament was in a state of outrage over the presidential rule which had been imposed on Uttarakhand.

Consequently, these fires went largely unchecked and spread from the pine forests on the slopes of the sub-Himalayan region to the oak and broadleaf forests which resulted in heavy clouds of smoke that changed the usually blue skies to grey. This smoke affected tourism within the state and fearing bad publicity, the locals did not report the fires.

The conservationist Ela Smetacek started a public awareness campaign to highlight the damage from the fires calling on the Indian government to address the issue. Her Facebook post was shared over 58,000 times as it showed the entire hillsides ablaze with walls of flames engulfing even the tallest trees.

The campaign gathered widespread support from social media users and Indian media, which led to a series of claims and counter-claims between the environment minister, the conservationist, and other activists ensued. This was due in large part to Smetacek blaming the timber and builder mafia for the purposely-lit fires, stating that 1,300 fires could be seen from satellite pictures and that an arson attack across the state was evident. The post demanding the fires be recognized as a national emergency, and the need of immediate deployment of NDRF teams, led to the government taking action, deploying the National Disaster Response Force and making use of Indian Air Force Mi-17 helicopters fitted with Helicopter bucket (bambi buckets) to douse the fires with water.

Seven fatalities were reported as of 4 May 2016. The Pinegrove School, a boarding school at Kasauli, was evacuated as fires had reached its compound walls. Tourism and wildlife at the Jim Corbett National Park and Rajaji Tiger reserve regions were affected. Various other locations in these Himalayan states of Uttarakhand and Himachal Pradesh are tourist attractions in summer, and they now face heavy air pollution. The forest fires also disrupted the functioning of the Kalka–Shimla Railway line. On 3 May, the forest department estimated the monetary losses at approximately ₹29 lakh (US$30,000). The estimate is based on the standard rule book followed by the department with empirical formulae for such calculations. Various ecologists and environmental activists have disregarded the estimate, noting that it does not take into account ecological and wildlife losses. They added that these fires have also destroyed vegetation which holds rainfall, which might result in floods in the monsoon season.

Scientists of the Govind Ballabh Pant Institute of Himalayan Environment and Development formed a team to survey the area and study the effects of the fires on the melting of glaciers. Ecologists suggested that clearing of forest floors of the fallen pine leaves, which are readily combustible, should be undertaken by the forest department as well as locals on a grassroots level to prevent such major fire outbreaks. Production of biomass briquettes from these pine needles should be promoted, serving as a source of fuel as well as a solution to prevent wildfires. On 30 April, the National Disaster Response Force was deployed for rescue operations in the Kumaon and Garhwal areas. Around 6,000 personnel from the Forest Department were deployed. As of 30 April 2016, 922 instances of fire were reported affecting around 2,000 hectares (4,900 acres) of forest area. The Mi-17 helicopters of the Indian Air Force with Helicopter bucket also known as bambi buckets, were used to douse the fires with water. However, the heavy smog that developed in the area affected the aerial operations of the army. The affected area later increased to around 3,500 hectares (8,600 acres), extending into Himachal Pradesh. The regions saw rainfalls on 3 May ranging from 7mm to 11mm, which helped in controlling the fire.

Soaring temperatures reignited the forest fires on 18 May 2016 covering an area of nearly 180 hectares of green land spreading over 111 districts. Rangers and Divisional Forest Officers rush to the spot and extinguish the fire as soon as possible to reduce the damage done. This was the result of the temperatures of Uttarakhand which were about 4 to 5 degrees higher than the average temperatures at this time of the year. According to government sources, the forest fires combined have destroyed nearly 4,048 hectares of land, in 1,857 incidents.

Subsequently, the World Bank granted 500 crores rupees (US$75M) to the Uttarakhand forest department to research the cause of the forest fires, which was later increased by ₹600 crores (US$90M).

The Indian central government later announced a series of funds amounting to over ₹50,000 crores (US$7.5B) to go towards afforestation across the state of Uttarakhand and the country.

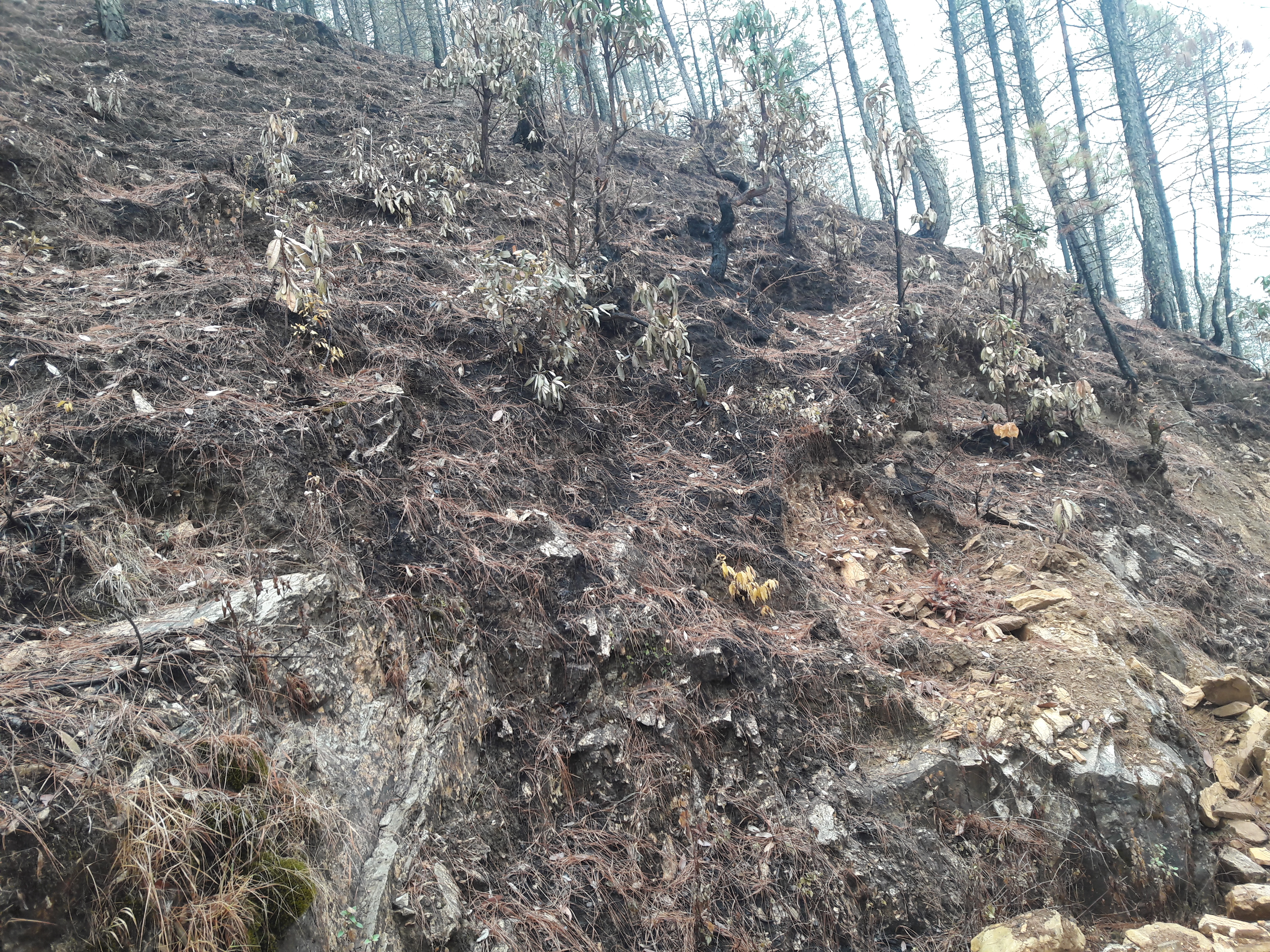
Vegetation destroyed in a forest near Dhaulinag Temple in Bageshwar district

== Controversy and long term impact ==
Reports were published in the local media which variously blamed both the local people and timber companies for the forest fires. Environmental journalist Bahar Dutt blamed the television media for their "Delhi centrist world view" that disregarded the historical and ecological natural causes of fire, due to the high density of pine trees that increase the fire hazards. Various tourism-related associations suggested that the exaggerated representation of the fires by the media could reduce tourism, a major part of the state economy. Part of a team of conservationists and biologists who studied the private and state forests since 1950, Smetacek maintained forest fires did not occur naturally in the geographical topography of the region concerned. Natural fires are not seen anywhere in Indian forests, she added. The introduction of pine trees by the British caused a more volatile fuel to the (man-made) fires.

Fires directly destroy biodiversity and have indirect long-term impacts, including the encouragement of fire and pioneer species. It has been suggested that the dark carbon dust emitted by the fires deposited on Himalayan glaciers could hasten the glaciers' melting. This could affect the hydrology of the rivers that are a source of water for human populations in northern India. The average temperature of northern India saw an increase of 0.2°C. Concern over forest fires in Uttarakhand has been increasing in the country and Indian Supreme Court took cognizance of the issue and issued strict measures to be implemented by the centre and the state governments.

== See also ==
- List of wildfires
- 2019 Bandipur forest fires
