= 2022 Mongolian wildfires =

Series of fires in Mongolia

- Part of Wildfires in 2022

Statistics
- Total area: one million hectares

In 2022, Mongolia suffered a historic number of wildfires. It was reported that 97 wildfires had burned across the country. By August 2022, it was reported that over one million hectares of land was burned. The number of wildfires was stated to be 73% higher than the 2021. In 2024, the United Nations Development Programme 1.64 million hectares of forest had been destroyed.
