= Evans Road Wildfire =

2008 wildfire in North Carolina, United States

The Evans Road Wildfire was a smoldering peat fire in Eastern North Carolina that started on June 1, 2008 by lightning strike during North Carolina's drought - the worst on record.

It burned 41,534 acres (168.08 km^{2}) inside the Pocosin Lakes National Wildlife Refuge and burned for three months. The wildlife refuge is located in the Albemarle-Pamlico Peninsula, where many forest fires are prone to start because of several ecological factors. The area is densely populated by trees, which makes it easy for fires to spread quickly; a layer of shrubs and dead plant material on the ground serve as fuel for fires. Under this layer, the pocosin soil is high in organic material, which acts as a charcoal-like substance that helps fires start.

450 firefighters battled it. 71 high capacity pumps moved billions of gallons of water.
