= 2022 Tierra del Fuego wildfire =

Wildfire in Chile

Location of the wildfire in southernmost Patagonia.

The 2022 Tierra del Fuego wildfire was a fire that affected the Chilean commune of Timaukel in the west of Tierra del Fuego Island in southernmost South America. The fire was discovered on January 20 but since no flames could be found it was reportedly believed that it was already extinguished. It began in land owned by the forestry company Forestal Russfin. Days later the fire was envigorated and consumed various hectares of forest.

By February 7 the fire had consumed 1,357 hectares of forest. The same day personnel from National Forest Corporation (Conaf) declared that the wildfire had been contained but that a reemergence was possible. Senator Guido Girardi called for cooperation with Argentina, European countries and the United States in facing to face emergency.

By February 12 the wildfire continued to burn and was affecting peatlands. It was also closing in toward Karukinka Natural Park. During the weekend of February 12 and 13 winds reactivated various focii of fire, but as of February 16 the fire was largely either contained or "under control". Aída Baldini, manager of the wildfire division of the National Forest Corporation, declared in late February that peatlands had largely escaped the fire given that they were humid.

The National Forest Corporation ended its works in the fire on March 16, 2022, declaring the fire to be extinguished. In total the wildfire lasted almost 50 days.
