= 2022 Kazakhstan wildfires =

Series of fires in Kazakhstan

The 2022 Kazakh wildfires were a series of wildfires in Kazakhstan that initially began in the country's northern Kostanay Region in the beginning of September 2022 and had quickly spread over large swaths of land with about 9,400 hectares being impacted by the night of 3 September.
