= List of fires in Canada =

This is a list of fires in Canada. Numbers for buildings only include those destroyed, and area is given in hectares and is converted to acres.

== List ==
Fire	Location	Province	Date	Deaths	Damage	Buildings	Area in ha/acre	Ref
1825 Miramichi fire	Northern New Brunswick	New Brunswick	Oct 1825	160–300			1–2 million ha (2.5–4.9 million acres)	
Fire in Quebec City	Quebec City	Province of Canada (Quebec)	May 1845	20	$1 million	100+		
Fire in Quebec City	Quebec City	Province of Canada (Quebec)	Jun 1845	40	$1.5 million	1,200		
Great Fire of 1846	St. John's	Colony of Newfoundland	Jun 1846	3	£888,356		600 ha (1,500 acres)	
Fire in Toronto	Toronto	Province of Canada (Upper Canada)	Apr 1849		$500,000			
Fire in Montreal	Montreal	Province of Canada (Quebec)	Jun 1850	0	$500,000	100		
Great Fire of 1852	Montreal	Province of Canada (Quebec)	Jul; 1852	0	$5 million	1,200		
Great Fire of Quebec City	Quebec City	Province of Canada (Quebec)	Oct 1866		$3 million	2,500		
Saguenay Fire	Saguenay–Lac-Saint-Jean, Quebec	Quebec	May 1870	7			15,000 ha (37,000 acres)	
Fire in Quebec City	Quebec City	Quebec	May 1876		$800,000	700		
Fire in Saint-Jean	Saint-Jean-sur-Richelieu	Quebec	Jun 1876		$2.5 million			
Fire in Saint-Hyacinthe	Saint-Hyacinthe	Quebec	Sep 1876		$1.25 million	583		
Great Fire of Saint John	Saint John	New Brunswick	Jun 1877	19	$28 million	1,612		
Fire in Hamilton	Hamilton	Ontario	Aug 1879		$500,000			
Fire in Quebec City	Quebec City	Quebec	Jun 1881		$2 million	800		
Fire in Toronto	Toronto	Ontario	Jan 1885		$700,000			
Great Vancouver Fire	Vancouver	British Columbia	Jun 1886	24–28	$1.3 million			
Calgary Fire of 1886	Calgary	North-West Territories (now Alberta)	Nov 1886	0	$103,200			
Great Fire of 1892	St. John's	Colony of Newfoundland	Jul; 1892		$13 million			
Simpson's fire in Toronto	Toronto	Ontario	Jan 1895		$600,000			
Fire in Windsor	Windsor	Nova Scotia	Oct 1897		$4 million			
Fire in New Westminster	New Westminster	British Columbia	Sep 1898		$2 million			
Warehouse fire in Montreal	Montreal	Quebec	Dec 1898		$8 million			
Warehouse fire in Montreal	Montreal	Quebec	Jan 1900		$2.5 million			
1900 Hull–Ottawa fire	Hull	Quebec	Apr 1900	7	$7.5 million			
Fire in Sydney	Sydney	Nova Scotia	Oct 1901		$500,000	60+		
Fire in Ottawa	Ottawa	Ontario	May 1903		$500,000	300+		
Fire in Saint-Hyacinthe	Saint-Hyacinthe	Quebec	May 1903		$500,000	400+		
Great Toronto Fire	Toronto	Ontario	Apr 1904		$13 million			
Fire in Trois-Rivières	Trois-Rivières	Quebec	Jun 1908		$2 million			
Fire in Fernie	Fernie	British Columbia	Aug 1908		$4 million			
Great Porcupine Fire	Timmins	Ontario	Jul; 1911	73–200			199,915 ha (494,000 acres)	
Matheson Fire	Black River-Matheson	Ontario	Jul; 1916	223–244		49 townships	200,000 ha (490,000 acres)	
Great Fire of 1919	Saskatchewan and eastern Alberta	Alberta; Saskatchewan	May 1919	11			2 million ha (4.9 million acres)	
Great Fire of 1922	Timiskaming District	Ontario	Oct 1922	43	$2 million		168,000 ha (420,000 acres)	
Knights of Columbus Hostel fire	St. John's	Dominion of Newfoundland	Dec 1942	99				
Mississagi Fire of 1948	Mississagi River	Ontario	May– Jul 1948	1			280,000 ha (690,000 acres)	
Chinchaga fire	Northern British Columbia and Alberta	Alberta; British Columbia	Jun– Oct 1950	0			1.4 to 1.7 million ha (3.5 to 4.2 million acres)	
Notre-Dame-du-Lac seniors' home fire	Notre-Dame-du-Lac	Quebec	Dec 1969	40				
Opémiska Community Hall fire	Chapais	Quebec	Jan 1980	48				
Manitoba wildfires	Manitoba		May, Jul– Aug 1989			100 homes	2.5 million ha (6.2 million acres)	
Hagersville Tire Fire	Hagersville, Ontario	Ontario	Feb 1990	0	0	Unknown	7.3 ha (18 acres)	
2001 Chisholm Wildfire	Chisholm	Alberta	May 2001			60+	116,000 ha (290,000 acres)	
McLure fire	North Thompson River	British Columbia	Jul– Aug 2003	0	$31.9 million	81	26,420 ha (65,300 acres)	
Okanagan Mountain Park Fire	Central Okanagan	British Columbia	Aug 2003	0	$33.8 Million	239	25,912 ha (64,030 acres)	
West Kelowna wildfires	West Kelowna	British Columbia	Jul; 2009	0	$403 million	4	9,877 ha (24,410 acres)	
May 2010 Quebec wildfires	La Tuque	Quebec	May 2010	0			90,000 ha (220,000 acres)	
2011 Slave Lake Wildfire	Slave Lake	Alberta	May 2011	1	$750 million	433	4,700 ha (12,000 acres)	
Richardson Fire	Richardson Backcountry	Alberta	May–Sep 2011	0	$350 to $450 million		700,000 ha (1,700,000 acres)	
Timmins Fire 9	Timmins	Ontario	May–Nov 2012	0			39,540 ha (97,700 acres)	
L'Isle-Verte nursing home fire	L'Isle-Verte	Quebec	Dec 2014	32				
2014 Northwest Territories fires	Northwest Territories		summer 2014	0	$56.1 million		3.4 million ha (8.4 million acres)	
2016 Fort McMurray wildfire	Northern Alberta (incl. Fort McMurray) and Saskatchewan	Alberta; Saskatchewan	May– Jul 2016	2	$9.9 billion (direct and indirect costs)	3,244	589,552 ha (1,456,810 acres)	
2017 British Columbia wildfires	Central and South Interior, and Alberta	Alberta; British Columbia	Jul– Sep 2017	0	$586 million	305+	1,216,053 ha (3,004,930 acres)	
2017 Alberta fires	Alberta; Saskatchewan		summer 2017	1		14+		
North Bay 69	Temagami	Ontario	Jul– Aug 2018	0			221 ha (550 acres)	
2018 Parry Sound forest fire	Parry Sound District	Ontario	Jul– Oct 2018	0			11,362.5 ha (28,077 acres)	
2018 British Columbia wildfires	British Columbia		summer 2018			50+	1,298,454 ha (3,208,550 acres)	
2019 Alberta wildfires	Northwestern and Central Alberta	Alberta	Mar–Dec 2019			16	883,414 ha (2,182,960 acres)	
Lytton wildfire	Lytton	British Columbia	Jun 2021	2	$78 million			
2023 Nova Scotia wildfires	Nova Scotia		summer 2023	0		250+	24,128 ha (59,620 acres)	
2023 Alberta wildfires	Alberta		2023				1.22 million ha (3.0 million acres)	
2024 Canada wildfires	Alberta; British Columbia		2024					
2025 Canadian wildfires	Manitoba; Ontario; Saskatchewan; Alberta; Quebec; Newfoundland and Labrador; New Brunswick; Nova Scotia		2025	2		631+	8.78 million ha (21.7 million acres)	
2026 Canadian wildfires	Alberta; British Columbia; Yukon; Manitoba; Saskatchewan; New Brunswick; Newfoundland and Labrador; Quebec; Ontario; Northwest Territories; Nova Scotia		2026	4		12+	2.40 million ha (5.9 million acres)	

== See also ==
- List of Canadian disasters by death toll
- List of fires in British Columbia
- List of fires
  - List of wildfires
- List of town and city fires
