= 2017 British Columbia wildfires =

Major wildfires in British Columbia, Canada

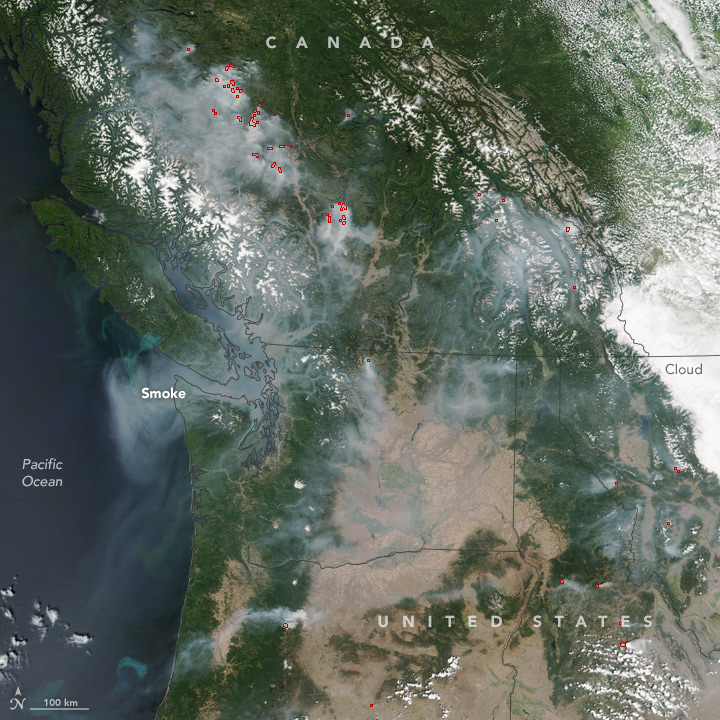
- Date: Evacuations: July 6, 2017 – September 20, 2017 Provincial state of emergency: July 7, 2017 – September 15, 2017
- Location: British Columbia, Canada

Statistics
- Burned area: 1,216,053 hectares (3,004,930 acres) as of December 5, 2017
- Land use: Forest and residential

Impacts
- Deaths: 0
- Injuries: Unknown
- Structures destroyed: 444
- Cost: Over $649,000,000

Ignition
- Cause: Lightning and Human-Caused
- Motive: unknown

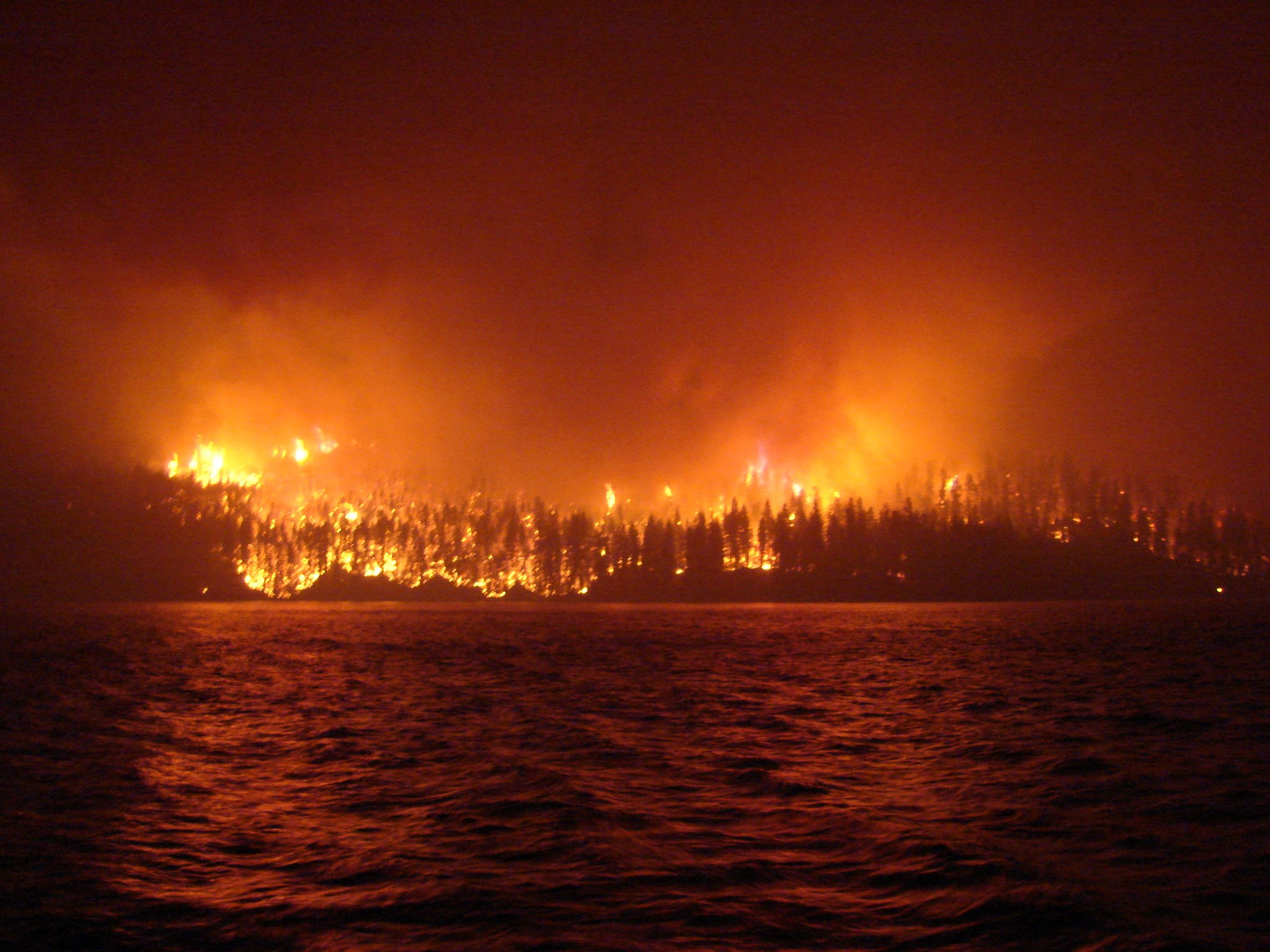
Ashcroft Reserve wildfire burning at Loon Lake, BC

On July 6, 2017, a two-hectare wildfire began west of 100 Mile House, British Columbia, Canada marking the beginning of the record-breaking 2017 wildfire season in British Columbia. On July 7, 56 new fires started throughout British Columbia (BC) leading to several evacuation alerts, orders and the declaration of a provincial state of emergency by the Government of British Columbia. By September 12, 158 fires were burning throughout the province. A total of 12,161 square kilometres (1.2 million hectares) had burned by the end of the 2017 fire season, the largest total area burned in a fire season in recorded history (1.3% of BC total area). This record was broken the following year, with five of BC's worst 10 fire seasons occurring since 2010. However, the 2017 fire season was also notable for the largest number of total evacuees in a fire season (65,000 people), as well as for the largest single fire at the time in British Columbia history. Research indicates that human-caused climate change played a significant role in the fires.

== Fire progression ==
On July 7, the first of many major fires began, starting at two hectares and quickly progressing to be eight times larger by that evening, requiring an evacuation alert that same day. By July 7, 140 fires had started throughout BC, most of them in the central interior. The fires were aggressive and grew quickly, prompting a state of emergency as well as several evacuation alerts and orders. The next day, 182 total fires were active throughout the province prompted the issuing of up to 20 evacuation alerts and orders. The Emergency Operating Centre in Prince George was activated, and Emergency Social Services opened a reception centre and shelter at the College of New Caledonia.

Within three days, the first major fire, that started at two hectares, had grown to 4,000 hectares resulting in a mandatory evacuation order with up to 2,000 residents evacuated. By the following day over 10,000 Williams Lake residents were on an evacuation alert. On July 11, a total of 200 active fires and 4,000 evacuees registered in Prince George, led to addition lodging at the University of Northern British Columbia

2017's fire season caused the closure of Highway 97 from Kersley, south of Quesnel, all the way south to Pavilion (along Highway 99), and south of Ashcroft. It also closed Bella Coola Highway to westbound traffic and created evacuation alerts the entire length of the Bella Coola Highway from Precipice to the junction with Williams Lake. No other fire season had had this breadth of large fires across the province.

Three fires have achieved particularly notable sizes of over 100,000 hectares. First, the Hanceville Fire resulted from the merger of the Hanceville, Riske Creek and Raven Lake fires along Highway 20. As of August 20, the fire reached its largest size of 227,000 hectares, spreading as far south as Gang Ranch west of 100 Mile House. The Elephant Hill fire started on the Ashcroft Reserve, and spread north of Highway 99 to Green Lake, east of 100 Mile House. Finally the Nazko Complex started as a series of smaller fires west of Quesnel, two of which were notable in their own right, the Baezaeko River Fire, and the Tautri Lake Complex. These fires merged August 18, 2017, along with the Chezacut Fire and the Arc Mountain Fire, to form the Nazko Complex at over 432,000 hectares. This single fire was later renamed the Plateau Complex, centred on the Chilcotin Plateau. Overall this behemoth fire covered a combined area of 545,151 hectares, making it the largest fire in B.C.'s recorded history (roughly the same size as Prince Edward Island) at the time. It was surpassed by the Donnie Creek fire in 2023. This fire was the result of nearly 20 separate fires merging.

== State of emergency ==
On July 7, a provincial state of emergency was declared by Todd Stone, Minister of Transportation and Infrastructure, on behalf of the Government of British Columbia. The state of emergency was extended on July 19 and again on August 4, and again on August 18, and again on September 1. This was the first state of emergency for British Columbia in 14 years, and the longest state of emergency in the province's history. On September 15, the state of emergency finally ended at midnight.

== Cause and contributing factors ==
A combination of dry lightning and human-caused fires started the 2017 BC wildfires. Human-caused climate change also played a significant role. Human-caused fires were both accidental and intentional; all wildfires in BC are investigated to determine the fire origin and cause. Fire bans and restrictions were put in place to limit further human-caused fires.

A study by researchers at Environment and Climate Change Canada found that climate change played a major role in the fires. They concluded that “the risk factors affecting the event, and the area burned itself, were made substantially greater by anthropogenic climate change... and that anthropogenic climate change increased the area burned by a factor of 7–11.”

Heat waves and a lack of rainfall throughout the province leading up to the wildfires had dried out vegetation and soil. Also, pine forests with many pine trees killed by mountain pine beetle provided optimal fuel for fires. Considering these contributing factors, most areas of BC were rated as at extreme or high risk of fire. The wildfires grew in size so quickly because of strong winds, in some regions up to 70 km/h.

On July 4, a car crash on Highway 1 near Cherry Creek caused a 15-hectare fire that was later contained by a crew of 47 fire fighters, 11 planes and a helicopter.

== Incidents ==
More than 39,000 people were evacuated from their homes and 30,000 cattle were threatened. The wildfires reportedly destroyed over 300 buildings ranging from homes and barns to commercial structures.

On July 15, a fire helicopter under contract to the BC Wildfire Service crashed in the Chilcotin. The only crew on board was a pilot who suffered non-life-threatening injuries.

== Resources ==
As of August 13, 3,906 firefighters were deployed to fight the fires, including 647 out-of-province personnel and 1,606 contractors. Crews fought the fires with the assistance of 233 helicopters and airplanes. In addition, 50 Australian firefighters, 80 Fire and Emergency New Zealand firefighters and 108 fire personnel from Mexico came to BC's aid.

Over 15 reception centres opened province-wide. In addition, five cities, from Surrey to Williams Lake opened group lodging centres for evacuees. The Red Cross opened support centres in Kamloops and Williams Lake and provided assistance to those affected by the fires with funds from donors, the federal government and the province of BC, as promised by Premier Christy Clark.

On September 5, 2017, Canadian Minister of Agriculture Lawrence MacAulay announced that farmers and ranchers impacted by the wildfires would be provided $20 million in aid by various levels of government.

== See also ==
- List of disasters in Canada
- List of fires in Canada
- List of fires in British Columbia
- List of wildfires
