= Blue Bird Café fire =

1972 nightclub fire in Montreal, Canada

Coordinates: 45.502745°N 73.566701°W

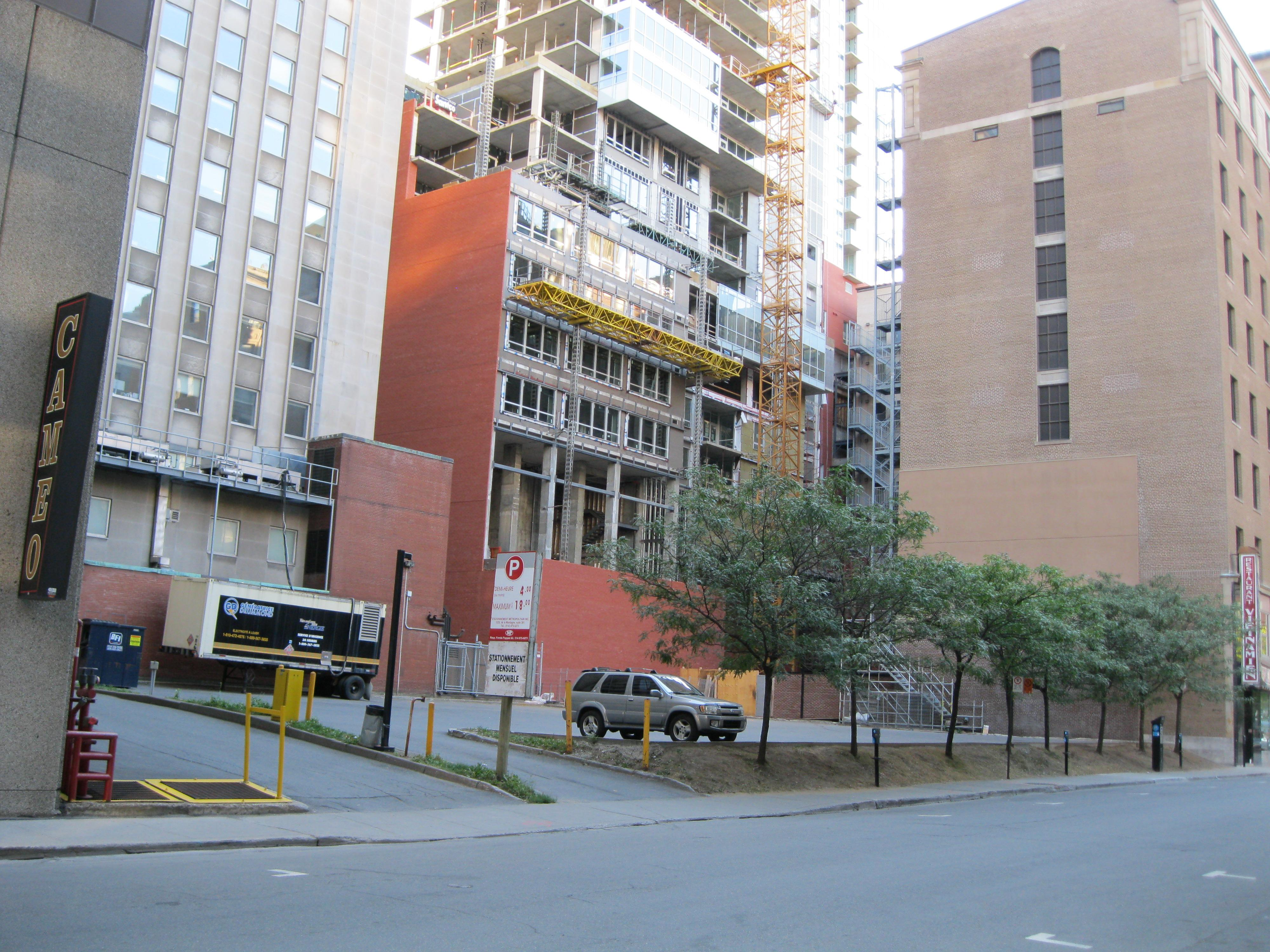
- Site of the Blue Bird in 2012, then a parking lot. Since 2018, it is the location of Tom Condos.
- Date: September 1, 1972
- Venue: Blue Bird Café
- Location: Montreal, Quebec, Canada
- Type: Fire
- Cause: Arson
- Deaths: 37
- Injuries: Five firefighters; Unknown number of civilians
- Convicted: Gilles Eccles; James O’Brien; Jean-Marc Boutin
- Charges: Arson, murder
- Verdict: Guilty
- Sentence: Life imprisonment (paroled within a decade)

The Blue Bird Café fire was a nightclub fire on September 1, 1972, in Montreal, Quebec, Canada. In all, 37 people were killed as a result of arson.

The fire was the deadliest in Montreal since 1927, when 77 people perished in the Laurier Palace Theatre Fire.

== Venue ==
Montreal’s Blue Bird Café and the Wagon Wheel, a country and western bar above it, were located on the west side of Union Street between Ste-Catherine Ouest and Dorchester (now René-Lévesque) in downtown Montreal, lying within the borough of Ville-Marie. The café and bar were known as places where largely working-class, English-speaking youth could come for an evening of music, dancing, and drinking.

== Fire ==
There was lots of pitch black smoke and then a lot of heat and a lot of yellow light ... We knew it was a fire. Everyone began to panic.

— George Lancia, survivor

On the evening of Friday, September 1, 1972—‌the beginning of Labour Day weekend—‌more than 200 people were at the bar celebrating. Around 10:45 p.m., three young men (initial reports said four) were refused entry to the upstairs bar, as they appeared excessively intoxicated. Upset by this, Gilles Eccles, James O’Brien and Jean-Marc Boutin set a fire on the staircase that served as the only regular entrance or exit for the Wagon Wheel's customers. "It was either a Molotov cocktail or gasoline spread on the stairs and then ignited," said Montreal Police Inspector Armand Chaillé. The entire bar was in flames within a few minutes, according to police.

With the primary escape route blocked by the fire advancing upward toward the crowded bar, its patrons sought out other exits. However, conflicting city building codes and fire regulations had left the upstairs bar with too few fire exits for its capacity of patrons. With the bar's main exit aflame and its sole fire exit blocked, patrons were forced to use one of two escape routes: through the kitchen onto a folding fire escape (the emergency exit was chained), or climbing through a window in the women's restroom and dropping some 20 feet (roughly 6 metres) onto a parked car.

At its peak, the fire was fought by more than 50 firefighters. Five firefighters would suffer from smoke inhalation before the fire was declared out. At the time, the wearing of self-contained breathing apparatus (SCBA) was a relatively new practice and not as common among firefighters as it is today. The fire was brought under control by 2:30 a.m. and extinguished by daybreak.

== Victims ==
While it was originally reported that 42 people had died, later investigation determined that 37 people succumbed and perished as smoke and fire overtook the bar. Police and firefighters found bodies in the bathrooms, huddled in a corner that had no exit, and jammed in a rear section of the club close to a back entrance.

== Investigation ==
At 3:30 a.m. Eccles was arrested and a manhunt was on for Boutin and O'Brien. They were arrested two weeks later, by coincidence, when the RCMP raided a duplex in Vancouver, British Columbia, in a narcotics operation. O'Brien handed the police a fake identification and couldn't spell the name on the ID. It wasn't until several hours later that the RCMP realised who they had arrested.

Details of what happened were revealed in an coronial inquiry held by Laurin Lapointe. On September 20, 1972, Boutin and O'Brien told the coroner that the three had been drinking all day. Boutin stated he estimated that he alone had consumed 26 pints of beer, 3 double gins and a rum before heading to the nightclub. After being refused entry, they drove to a gas station and filled an empty one gallon bleach bottle with gasoline. Eccles had passed out in the car by time they returned the nightclub and O'Brien and Boutin proceeded to the nightclub "to set the stairs on fire" according to Boutin. Boutin and O'Brien were sentenced to life in prison for non-capital murder and Eccles was given a life sentence for manslaughter. All three were paroled within a decade of their convictions.

The coroner Lapointe, in his final report on October 6, 1972, criticised the government officials over how building inspections were performed in the city. The building had been approved for remodelling in 1961, which included 3 fire escapes to bring it up to code, however significant changes were later made without permits. These were not "noticed" by building subsequent building inspections. During the inquiry, the buildings owner, Leonard Pare stated that a fire inspector verbally gave him approval to keep the downstairs door locked, so long as there were 2 other exits i.e. the main entry staircase (which was blocked by the fire) and a second fire escape accessible through a narrow door in the kitchen, (which was partially blocked by a stove, the folding ladder was rusty and broke). Other witnesses stated the downstairs door was locked to prevent entry to people sneaking in to avoid the cover charge.

== Aftermath ==
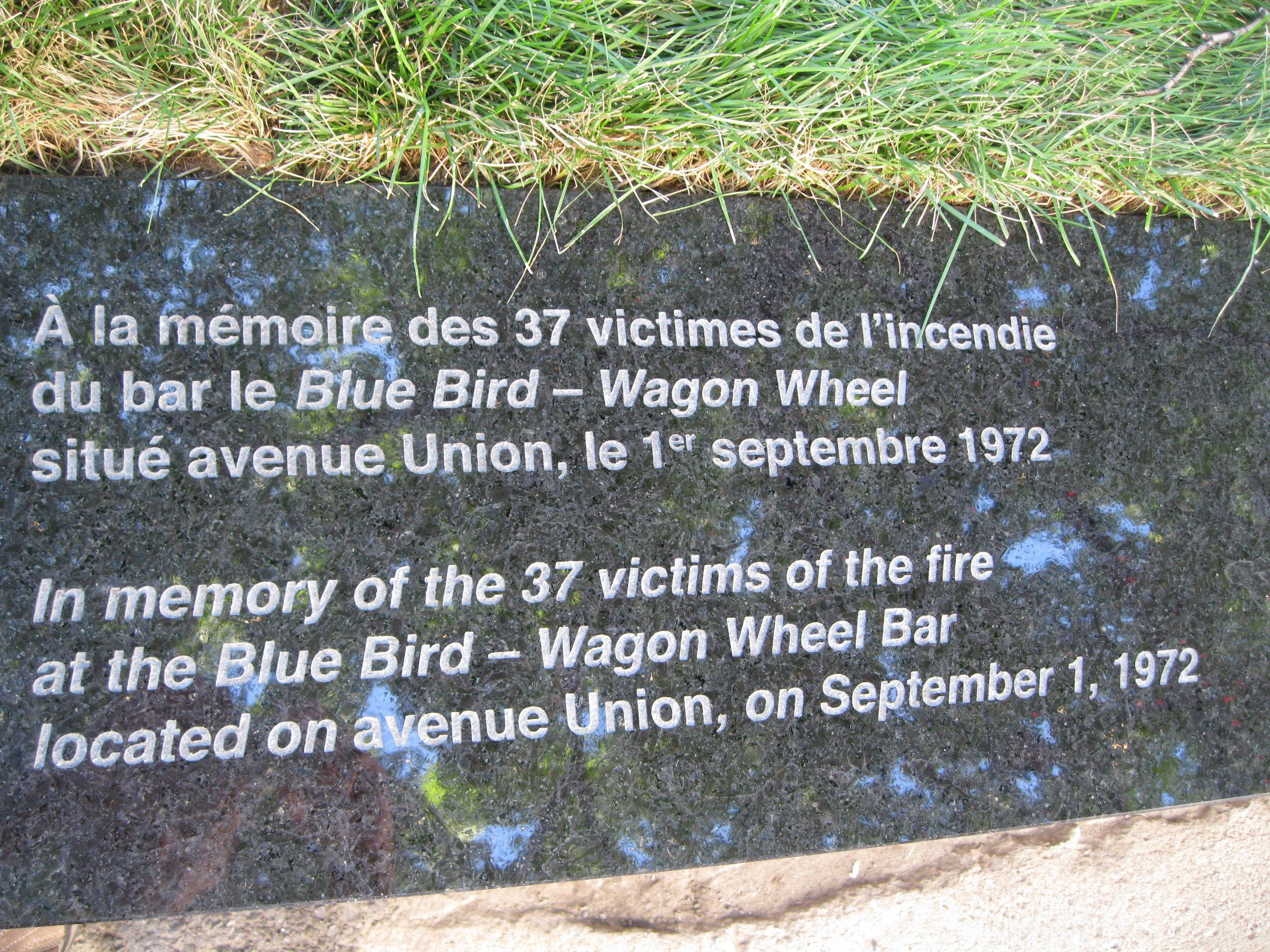
Memorial on Phillips Square

In the aftermath of the fire, regulations throughout Canada were strengthened to provide for more avenues of escape.

Owing to the blocked fire exit, a lawyer for the victims' families proposed a $9 million civil lawsuit against the Montreal fire department, bar owner Leopold Paré, and the building's owner, with the defence led by Montreal mayor Jean Drapeau. The families eventually accepted a much lower settlement offer of $1,000 to $3,000 per victim.

On August 31, 2012, a memorial was unveiled by the city of Montreal to mark the 40th anniversary. A mass was held as well as a march by families of the victims along with a photo exhibit at city hall, with a vigil on September 1.

In August 2020, it was reported that James O'Brien violated his parole for the third time in the past decade for being intoxicated with alcohol and was sent back to prison.

As of May 2022 the memorial has been installed at the south side of Phillips Square following the renovation of the square.

On September 1, 2022, a 50th anniversary memorial was held in Phillips Square that included survivors and relatives of people who lost their lives in the fire.

== See also ==
- List of fires in Canada
- Denmark Place fire, 1980 London fire started by drunken patron refused entry by lighting gasoline in front of main entrance and only exit; also killed 37
- Happy Land fire, 1990 New York City fire started in same fashion by ejected club patron; killed 87, making it the worst single-perpetrator mass murder in the city's history.
- Knights of Columbus Hostel fire
- L'Isle-Verte nursing home fire
