= West Kelowna wildfires =

2009 wildfires in British Columbia, Canada

2009 West Kelowna wildfires
- Date: July 18 – August 14, 2009
- Location: West Kelowna and surrounding area

Statistics
- Burned area: 9,877 hectares (24,410 acres) total;
- Land use: Parkland, Rural

Impacts
- Structures lost: 4

Ignition
- Cause: Suspected human cause

On July 18, 2009, 3 wildfires broke out around the city of West Kelowna, British Columbia during extremely dry and windy conditions. Over 20,000 people were evacuated as a result of the fires. 9,877 hectares (24,410 acres) of forest was burned along with 4 buildings. All 3 fires were suspected as human caused but the exact ignition source is still unknown.

== Fires ==
=== Glenrosa Fire ===
The Glenrosa Fire started at around 2:30 pm above the Glenrosa subdivision in West Kelowna, British Columbia. The fire quickly exploded due to extremely dry conditions and heavy down slope winds. The fire posed an immediate threat to the entire subdivision, over 4,500 homes were evacuated affecting over 10,000 people. Incredibly, only 4 homes were lost and the fire was quickly contained a few days later after burning 400 hectares (990 acres) acres of forest.

=== Rose Valley Fire ===
The Rose Valley Fire started at around 7:30 pm, July 18, 2009, behind the Rose Valley subdivision on the east side of West Kelowna. The fire burned aggressively overnight and was estimated at 150 hectares by 9:00 pm, July 19. Over 8,000 people were evacuated but no structures were lost or damaged. Fire activity remained minimal and it was fully contained a few days later. Total area burnt 200 hectares (490 acres).

=== Terrace Mountain Fire ===
The Terrace Mountain Fire started at around 5:30 pm, July 18, 2009, in the mountains behind Fintry, British Columbia, just north of West Kelowna. The fire was considered to be the least threatening of the 3 fires and burned with minimal suppression efforts for the first 12 hours. Resources on site include 70 firefighters, 4 water-bucketing helicopters, heavy equipment and air tankers. There are no evacuations or alerts at this point although the fire is moving east towards Okanagan lake. Total area burnt 9,877 hectares (24,410 acres).

==== Timeline of the Terrace Mountain Fire ====
- July 18;

- The Terrace Mountain Fire started at around 5:30 pm

- July 19;

- The Terrace Mountain Fire grows to 875 hectares by 9:00 pm.
- Dense dry fuels, high temperatures, low humidity and moderate winds contribute to the fires growth.
- 9:00 am, minimal growth reported overnight, now 30% contained.
- 9:00 pm, fire grows to 1,300 hectares.
- 10:00 pm, the fire grows to 1,050 hectares and is 15-20% contained.

- July 21;

- 9:00 am, the fire did not grow overnight. Evacuation alerts are in place for residents in the back country west of Fintry.

- July 22;

- 9:00 am, fire estimated at 2000 hectares.
- 12:00 pm, 13 people evacuated from Fintry High Farm. 2,200 people along Westside Road communities are now under evacuation alert.

- July 23;

- 5:00 am, extreme fire activity reported.
- 8:00 am, fire estimated at 4,000 hectares. 2,200 people now on evacuation order.

- July 24–31;

- 9:00 am, rain slows fire growth. Now estimated at 4,400 hectares.

- August 1;

- The fire is now 90% contained. Fire is still estimated at 4,400 hectares.
- A massive flare up on the east flank sends the fire burning towards the lake. 1,200 people are placed on an evacuation order and another 2,500 on evacuation alert.

- August 2–13;

- 8:00 am, the fire is now estimated at 7,000 hectares. 2,700 residents are on evacuation order.
- The fire is officially mapped at 7,500 hectares, activity remains minimal.
- Cool weather helps with fire suppression efforts. The fire is now 9000 hectares in size and is 75% contained.

- August 14;

- Heavy rains suppress the Terrace Mountain Fire, final size is 9277 hectares.

== See also ==
- List of fires in Canada
- List of disasters in Canada
