= List of wildfires in British Columbia =

British Columbia is the westernmost province in Canada, and is prone to wildfires. Wildfires are extremely common during summer, and 2023 had the worst wildfire season on record with 2,840,104 of hectares burned at a cost of $1,094.8 million.

== Inclusion criteria and organization ==
Only fires with at least 10,000 hectares burned are allowed, unless deaths involved. The wildfires are organized by date. If there are multiple wildfires on a certain date, the larger wildfire goes on top.

== 1908 ==
Fire name	Hectares burned	Date discovered	Comments	Link
Fernie fire	64,000		22 deaths, town of Fernie completely destroyed.	

== 1938 ==
Fire name	Hectares burned	Fire Centre	Date discovered	Comments	Link
Bloedel fire	75,000	Sayward	July 5 1938	0 deaths, the fire burned for 30 days on the north of Vancouver Island directly outside the village of Sayward. The effort to extinguish the fire was the largest in British Columbia's history up to that point. It was British Columbia's largest recorded wildfire until it was surpassed in size by the Chelaslie River fire in 2014.	

== 2003 ==
Fire name	Hectares burned	Fire Centre	Date discovered	Comments	Link
Midwinter Lake fire	32,000	Prince George			
Chilko Lake/Chilko River fire	29,202	Cariboo			
McLure fire	26,420	Kamloops			
Okanagan Mountain Park fire	25,600	Kelowna			
Lamb Creek fire	11,882	Southeast			
McGillvray fire	10,979	Kamloops			

== 2004 ==
Fire name	Hectares burned	Fire Centre	Date discovered	Comments	Link
Coal River fire	32,000	Prince George			
Swan Lake fire	29,962	Northwest			
Lonesome Lake fire	22,745	Cariboo		Historic "Crusoe of Lonesome Lake" homestead lost.	
McBride River fire	14,000	Northwest			
Kotcho Lake fire	13,325	Prince George			
Kenney fire	10,300	Prince George			

== 2005 ==
Fire name	Hectares burned	Fire Centre	Date discovered	Comments	Link
15 km East of Tatuk Lake fire	12,371	Prince George			

== 2006 ==
Fire name	Hectares burned	Fire Centre	Date discovered	Comments	Link
Mt Hamelin fire	12,051	Prince George			
Narcosli Ecological Reserve fire	11,500	Cariboo			
Tezla Lake fire	10,961	Cariboo			
Dall Lake fire	10,600	Prince George			

== 2009 ==
Fire name	Hectares burned	Fire Centre	Date discovered	Comments	Link
Lava Canyon fire	66,719	Cariboo			
Junction of Smith and Liard Rivers fire	23,182	Prince George			
Kelly Creek fire	20,925	Cariboo			

== 2010 ==
Fire name	Hectares burned	Fire Centre	Date discovered	Comments	Link
NW of Meldrum Creek Complex	47,293	Cariboo			
Binta Lake fire	40,000	Northwest			
Pelican Lake Complex	35,506	Cariboo			
Old Faddy fire	35,284	Northwest			
Bull Canyon Complex	35,000	Cariboo			
Sheslay River fire	28,000	Northwest			
NW of Tsacha Lake fire	13,087	Prince George			

== 2011 ==
Fire name	Hectares burned	Fire Centre	Date discovered	Comments	Link
Blue River fire	11,000	Northwest			

== 2012 ==
Fire name	Hectares burned	Fire Centre	Date discovered	Comments	Link
White Spruce Creek fire	24,852	Prince George			
Suhm Creek fire	12,196	Prince George			

== 2014 ==
Fire name	Hectares burned	Fire Centre	Date discovered	Comments	Link
Chelaslie River fire	133,098	Northwest			
Tenakihi-Mesilinka Complex fire	64,576	Prince George			
Forres Mountain fire	29,672	Prince George			
Red Deer Creek fire	33,547	Prince George			
Mount McAllister fire	26,273	Prince George			
Euchiniko Lakes fire	21,518	Prince George			

== 2015 ==
Fire name	Hectares burned	Fire Centre	Date discovered	Link
Little Bobtail Lake fire	25,569	Prince George	May 8	
Elaho fire	12,523	Coastal		

== 2016 ==
Fire name	Hectares burned	Date discovered	Link
Beatton Airport Road fire	15,739	April 18	
Siphon Creek Road / Doig Reserve fire	62,700	April 18	

== 2017 ==
Fire name	Hectares burned	Date discovered	Link
Elephant Hill fire	191,865	July 6	
The Plateau fire	545,151	July 7	
Hanceville Riske Creek fire	241,160	July 7	
Kleena Kleene	25,558	July 7	
White Lake fire	13,211	July 7	
Wildwood fire	12,723	July 7	
Kluskoil Lake 1 fire	21,870	July 10	
Gustafsen Lake fire	5,700	July 6	

== 2018 ==
Fire name	Hectares burned	Date discovered	Link
Tommy Lakes fire	21,795	May 22	
Snowy Mountain fire	17,068	July 17	
Shovel Lake fire	92,255	July 27	
Chutanli Lake fire	20,412	July 30	
North of Tezzeron Lake fire	10,602	July 30	
Nadina Lake fire	86,766	July 31	
Verdun Mountain fire	34,586	July 31	
Alkali Lake fire	118,318	August 1	
Shag Creek fire	12,322	August 1	
Island Lake fire	20,468	August 1	
North Baezaeko fire	11,508	August 1	
Lutz Creek fire	76,100	August 4	
W Babine River fire	10,800	August 5	
Hugh Allen Creek fire	10,000	August 6	
Tweedsmuir Complex	301,549	August 8	
Cool Creek fire	13,626	August 15	

== 2021 ==
Fire name	Hectares burned	Date discovered	Link
Lytton wildfire	83,740	June 30	

== 2022 ==
Fire name	Hectares burned	Date discovered	Link
R90436 (Unnamed)	12,330	July 2	
Heather Lake fire	14,970	August 21	
Battleship Mountain fire	31,755	August 30	

== 2026 ==
Fire name	Hectares burned	Date discovered	Link
Big Bar Complex	186,738	July 17	
Bradley Creek fire	2,852	July 31	
Bald Range fire	22,693	August 7	

== See also ==
- List of fires in Canada
- 2017 British Columbia wildfires
- 2018 British Columbia wildfires
- List of wildfires
