= May 2010 Quebec wildfires =

Series of more than 120 wildfires

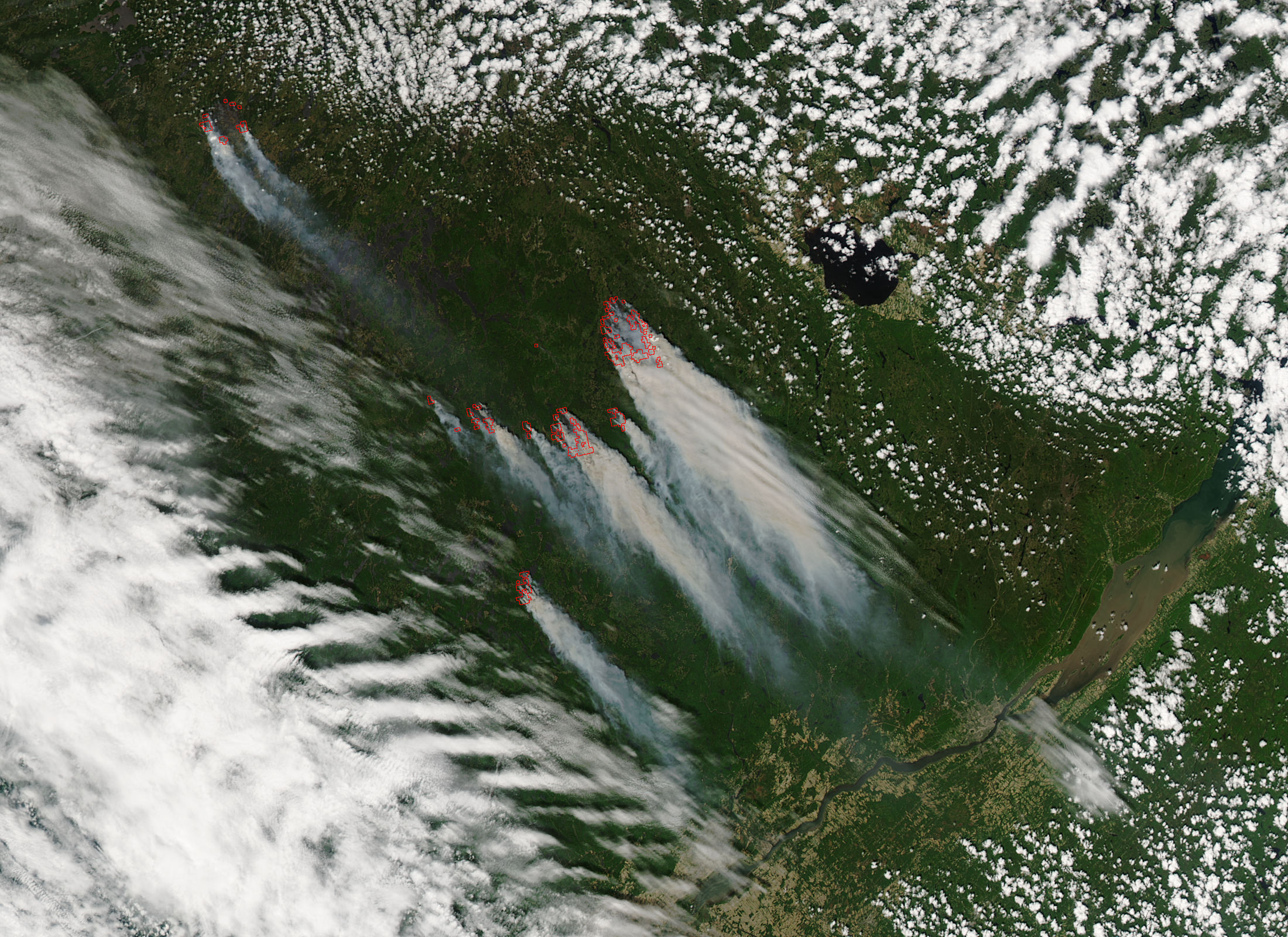
- Satellite imagery of southern Quebec with active wildfires outlined in red, June 2, 2010
- Date: May–June 2010
- Location: Quebec, Canada

Statistics
- Burned area: at least 90,000 hectares (220,000 acres)

The May 2010 Quebec wildfires were a series of wildfires that affected over 90,000 hectares (220,000 acres) from late May to June 2010. Over 120 fires broke out in one week, with most near La Tuque, 300 kilometers (190 mi) northeast of Montreal. Smoke from the wildfires caused smog warnings and resulted in heightened air quality indices throughout southern Quebec, including Montreal, Laval, and the Estrie, Montérégie, Lanaudière, Mauricie, and Centre-du-Québec regions; areas such as Ottawa and New England as far southeast as Eastern Massachusetts and Rhode Island also reported poor air quality. The First Nations reserve of Wemotaci, where firefighters were forced to retreat due to the intensity of the fires and density of the resulting smoke, was evacuated, with more than 1,300 residents being temporarily relocated to the neighbouring city of La Tuque. Marcel Trudel, spokesman of SOPFEU—the organization responsible for containing the wildfires—reported that flames as high as 30 metres (98 ft) had been observed near the reserve. Three other communities—two of them also First Nations reserves—were evacuated as well. More than 1,200 firefighters worked to control the fires, including 200 from other provinces as well as from the U.S. states of Maine, Massachusetts, New Hampshire and Rhode Island.

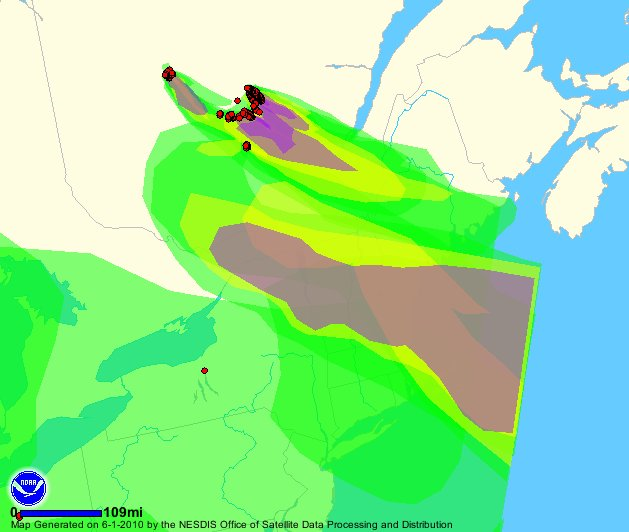
Thick clouds of smoke produced by the wildfires covered New England. June 1, 2010.

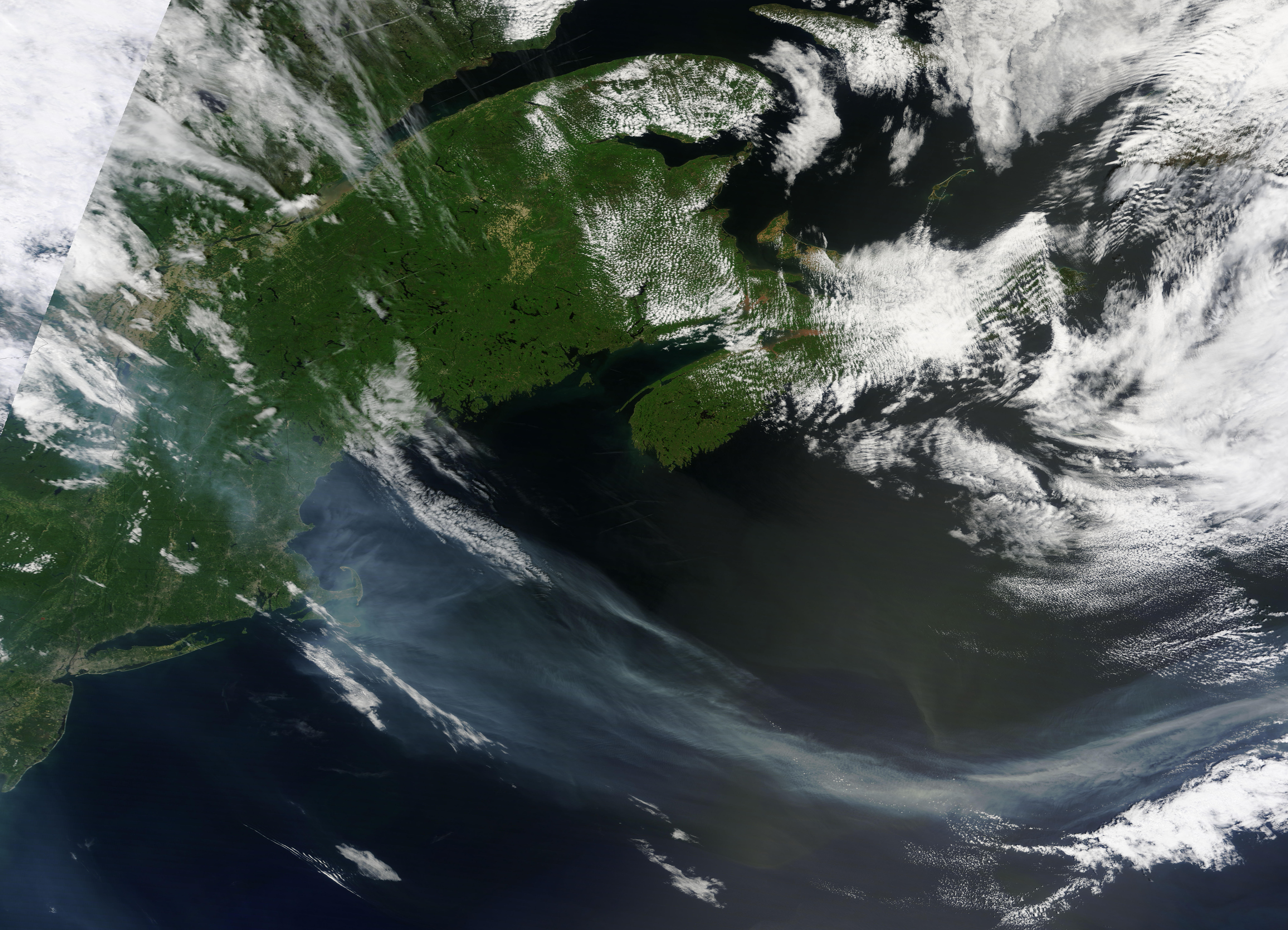
Smoke over New England and the North Atlantic Ocean.

== See also ==
- List of fires in Canada
- List of wildfires
