= 2014 Northwest Territories fires =

2014 forest fire season in Northwest Territories

2014 Northwest Territories Fires
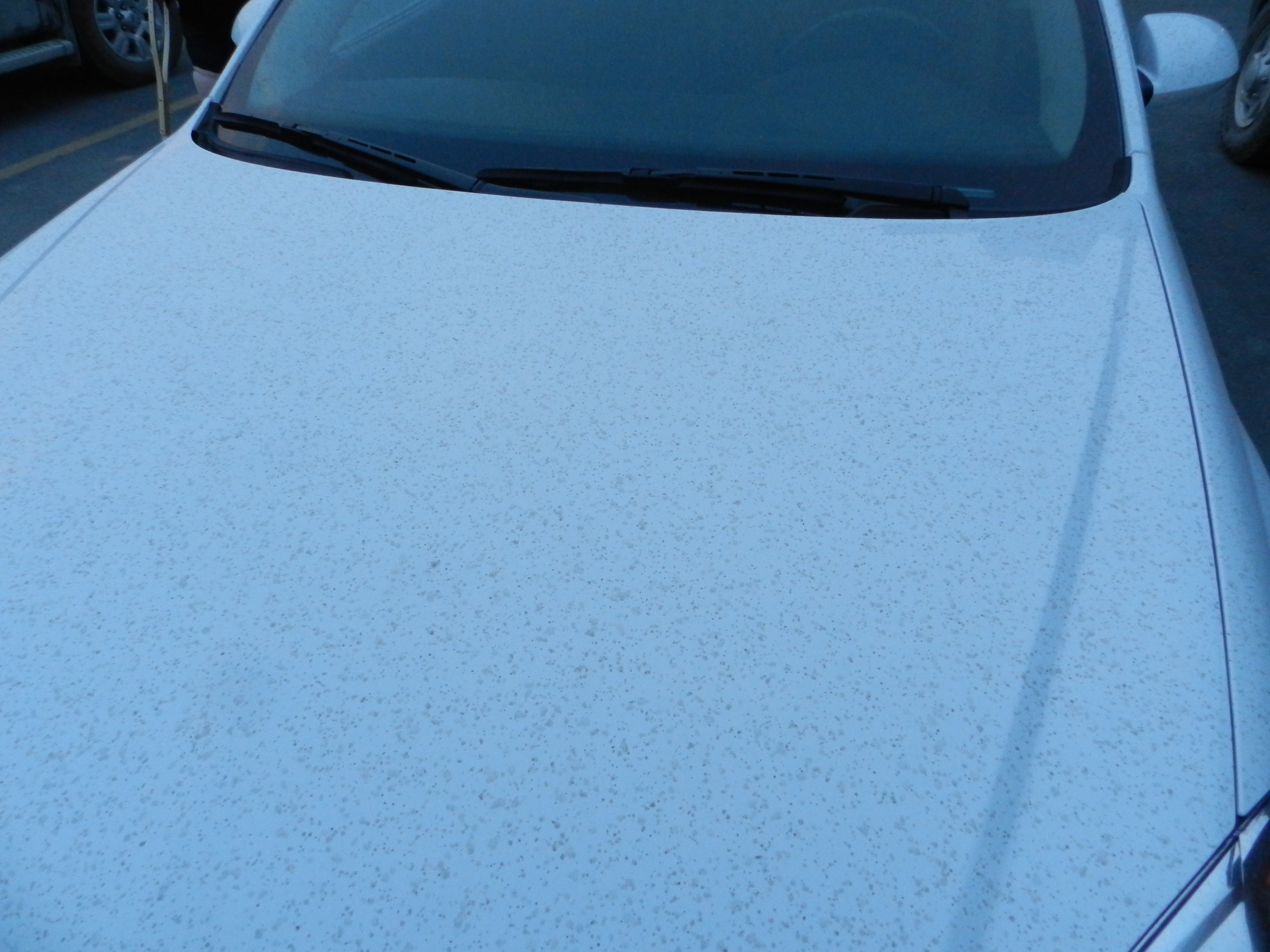
- Ashes from the fires on the hood of a car in Yellowknife
- Date: Summer 2014
- Location: Northwest Territories, Canada

Statistics
- Burned area: 3,500,000 ha (8,600,000 acres)

Impacts
- Deaths: Unknown
- Injuries: Unknown
- Cost: $44.37 million (2014 USD)

Ignition
- Cause: Lightning, human error

The 2014 forest fire season in the Northwest Territories of Canada is reputed to be the second worst for at least three decades, only surpassed by the 2023 forest fire season. As of 3 July, there had been 123 fires reported in the territory, of which at least 92 were still active and 13 were thought to be human-caused. By 9 July the total had reached 164 fires and on 10 July over 130 fires were thought to be burning. The smoke generated by the fires was blown into the Prairie Provinces and created a moderate health risk there leading Environment Canada to declare an air quality advisory for southern Saskatchewan and Manitoba on 9 July.

The smoke reached as far away as Bismarck, North Dakota, over 2,000 km (1,200 mi) south. The smoke was also observed drifting north into Nunavut and east to the Maritime Provinces and as far as Portugal. By July 8 the largest fires were the Lutselk'e fire at 31,000 ha (77,000 acres) and the Gamèti-Wekweeti fire at 25,000 ha (62,000 acres). By 9 July an area of 5,000 km^{2} (1,900 sq mi) had been consumed, about the size of the island of Trinidad.

As of 18 September 2014, the Government of the Northwest Territories estimated that 3,500,000 ha (8,600,000 acres) of forest had been burnt and that the fire fighting cost C$55 million (US$44.37 million).

One study suggested that a record number of lightning ignitions during 2014 drove a significant amount of the fires. The Northwest Territories complex emitted 164 teragrams of carbon (TgC).

Perimeters of 2014 Northwest Territories fires (map data)

== See also ==
- List of fires in Canada
