= Tom Condos =

TOM Condos
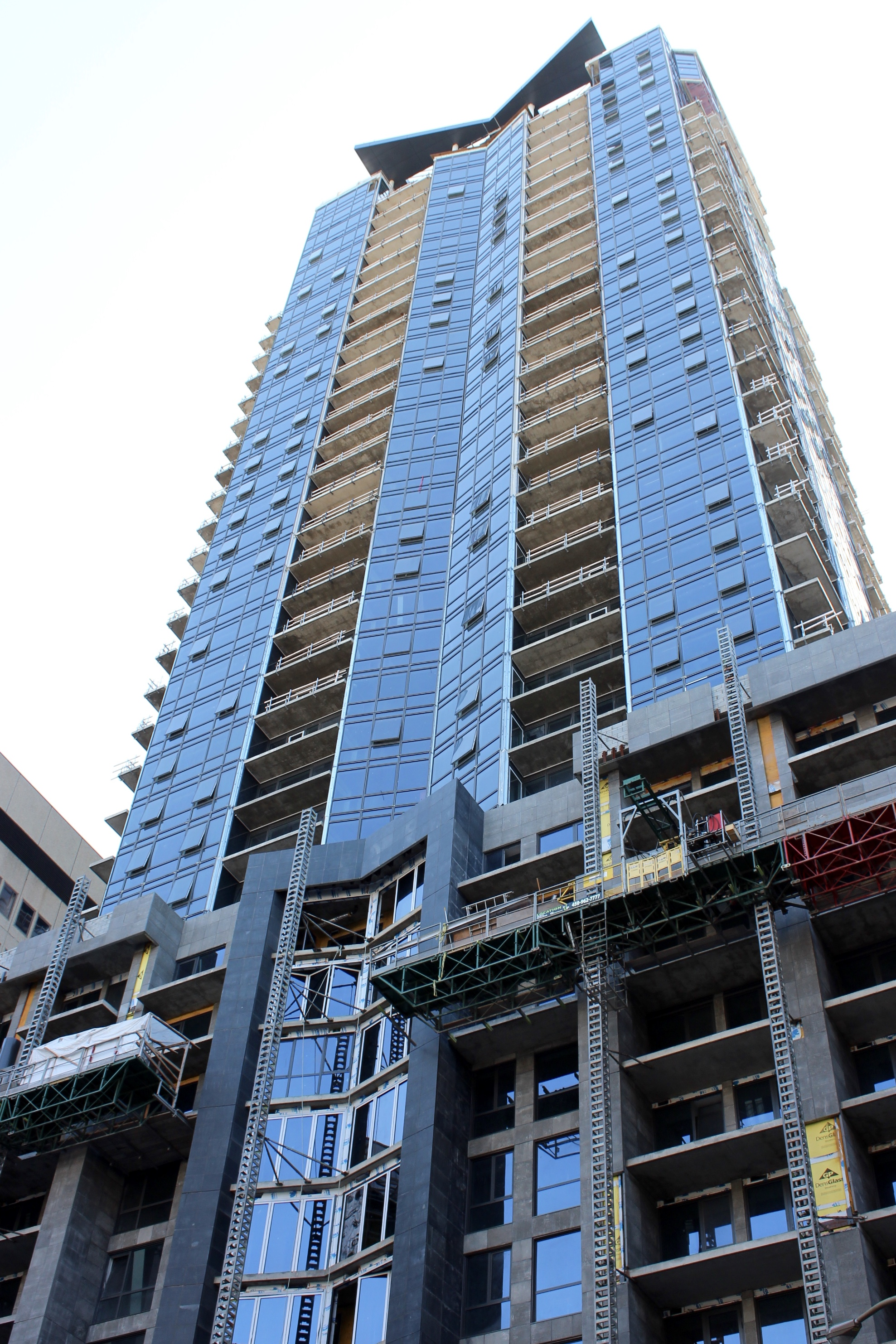
- TOM Condos under construction in 2017
- Interactive map of the TOM Condos area

General information
- Status: Completed
- Type: Condominiums
- Location: 1200 Union Avenue, Montreal, Quebec, Canada
- Coordinates: 45°30′10″N 73°34′04″W
- Construction started: June 2014
- Completed: 2018
- Cost: C$90 million

Height
- Height: 122 m (400 ft)

Technical details
- Floor count: 40
- Lifts/elevators: 3

Design and construction
- Architect: Karl Fischer
- Structural engineer: Bouthillette Parizeau
- Other designers: Andres Escobar and Associates

Website
- tomcondos.com

TOM Condos is a skyscraper in Montreal, Quebec, Canada. The tower is located on Union Avenue between René-Lévesque Boulevard and Cathcart Street, near the Altitude Montreal tower and the Place Ville Marie. Part of the building occupies the site of 1972's Blue Bird Café fire.

The tower has 40 floors and 122 m (400 ft) tall, and consists of 322 condos. The architect is Karl Fischer. The project's promoter is Daniel Revah.

Construction started in June 2014, with a completion date sometime in 2018.

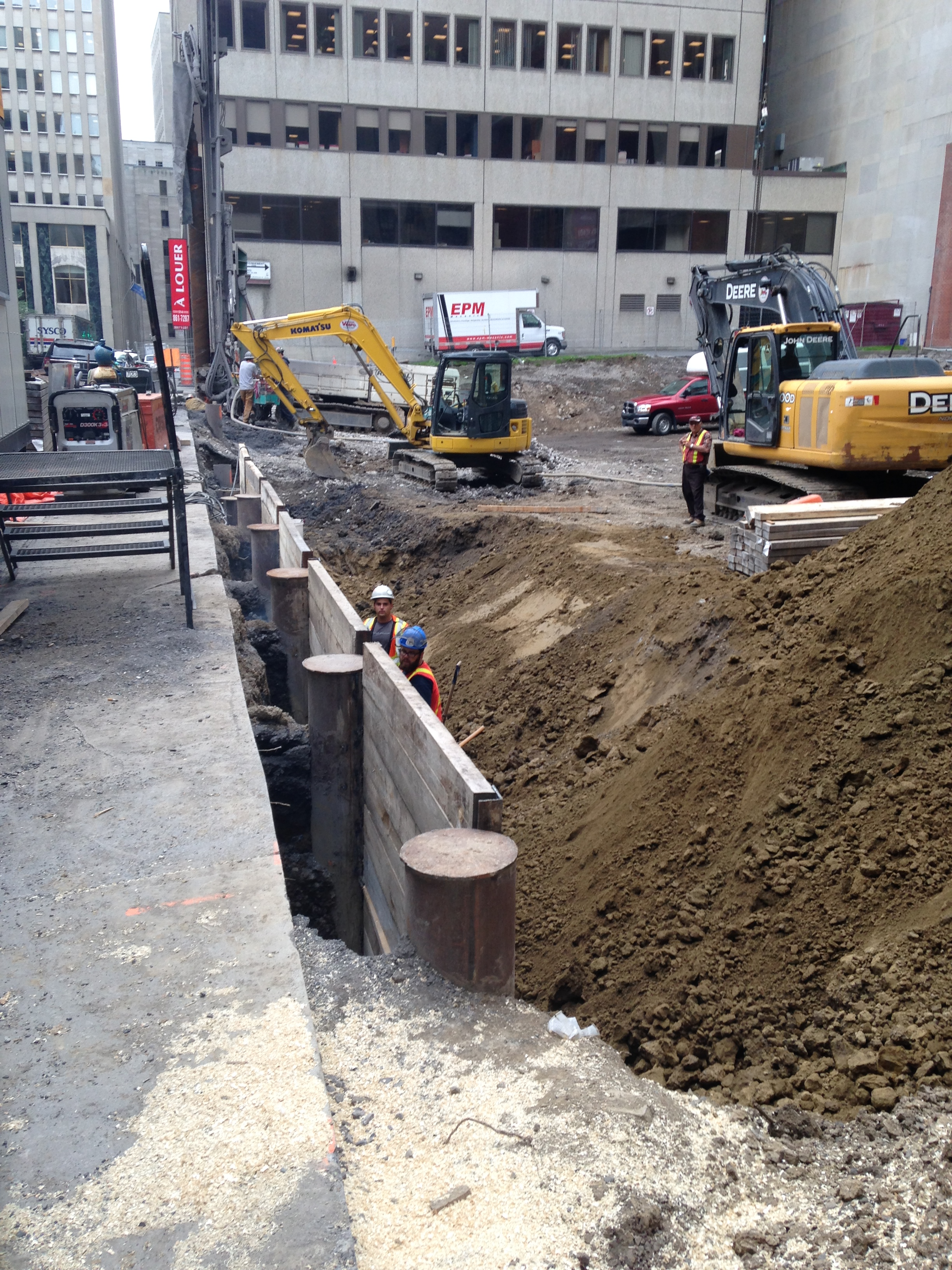
Construction site in July 2014

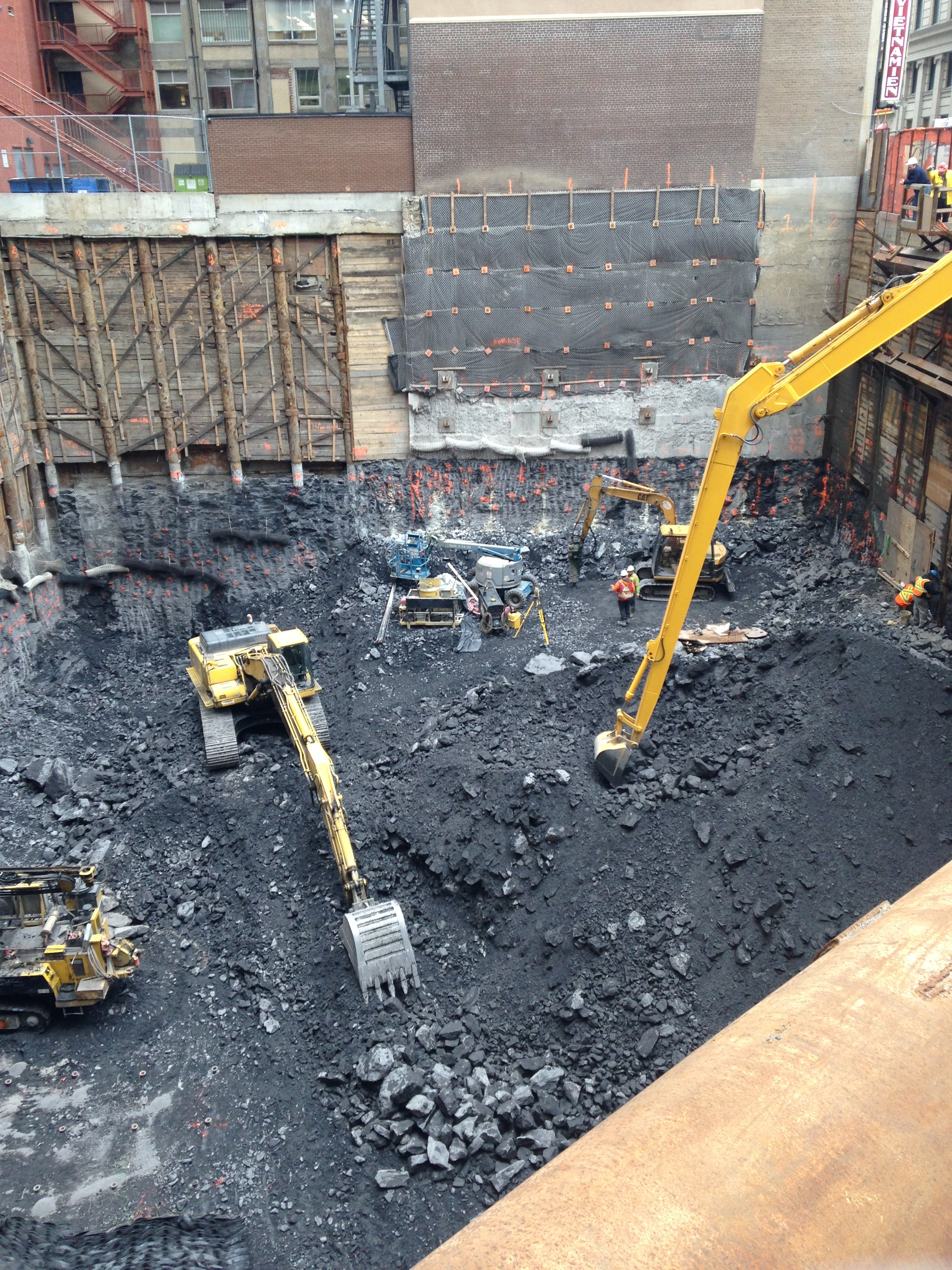
Construction site in April 2015

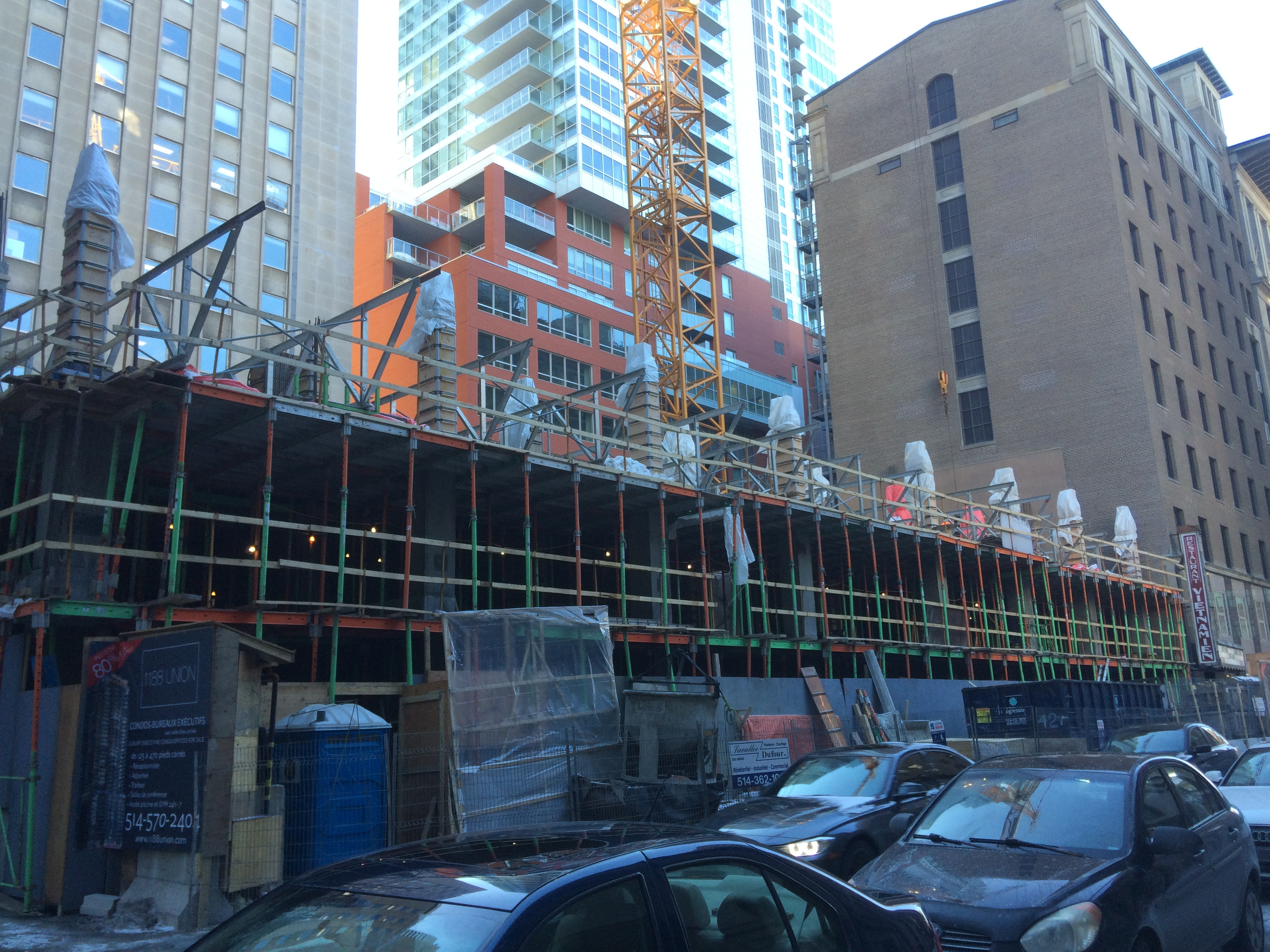
Construction site in February 2016

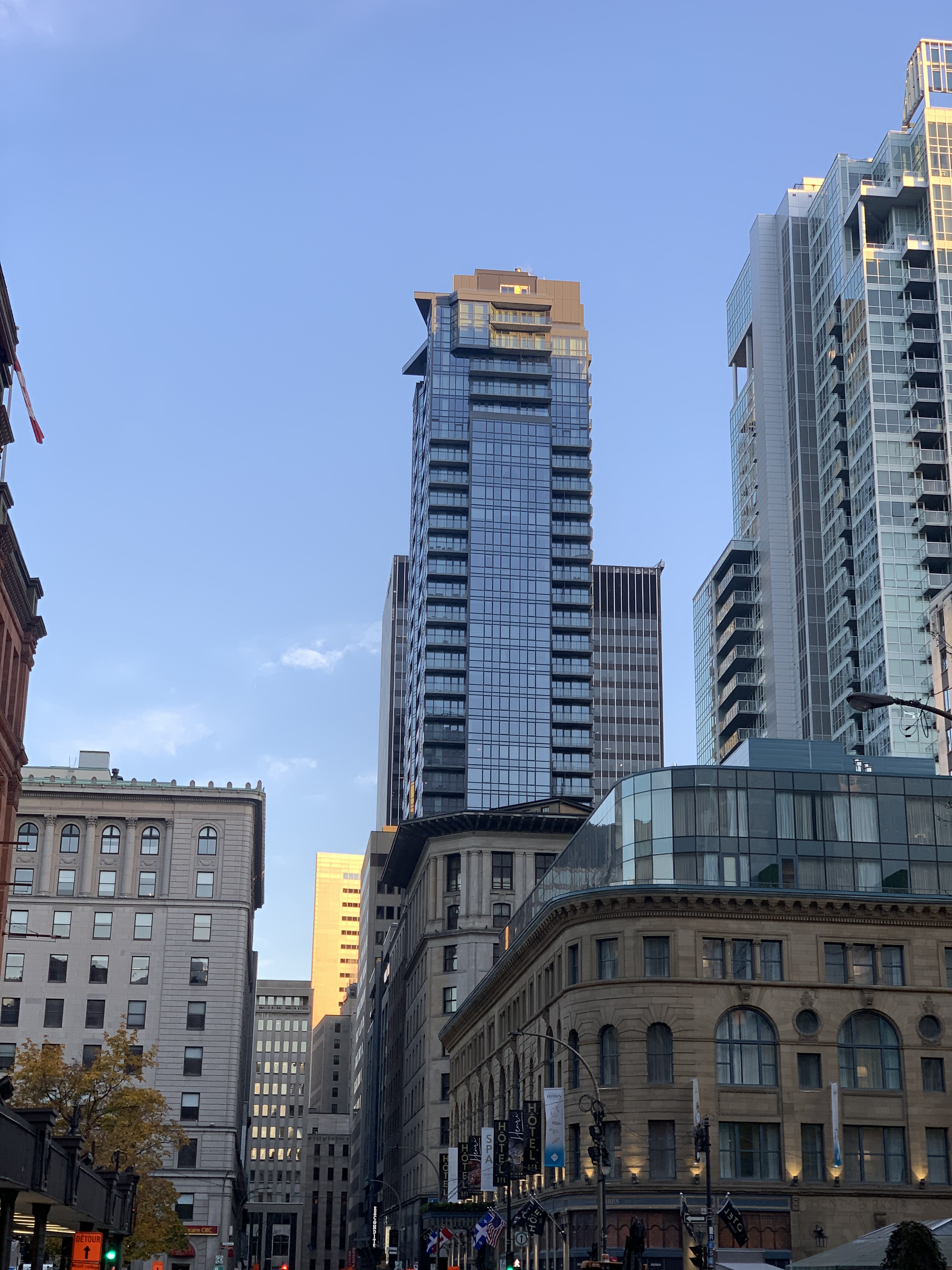
View of TOM Condos tower from Union avenue
