= Karl Fischer (architect) =

American architect

- Born: February 22, 1949; Gemzse, Hungary
- Died: March 12, 2019 (aged 70); Vermont, United States
- Education: McGill University School of Architecture
- Occupation: Architect
- Practice: Karl Fischer Architect and Karl Fischer PLLC

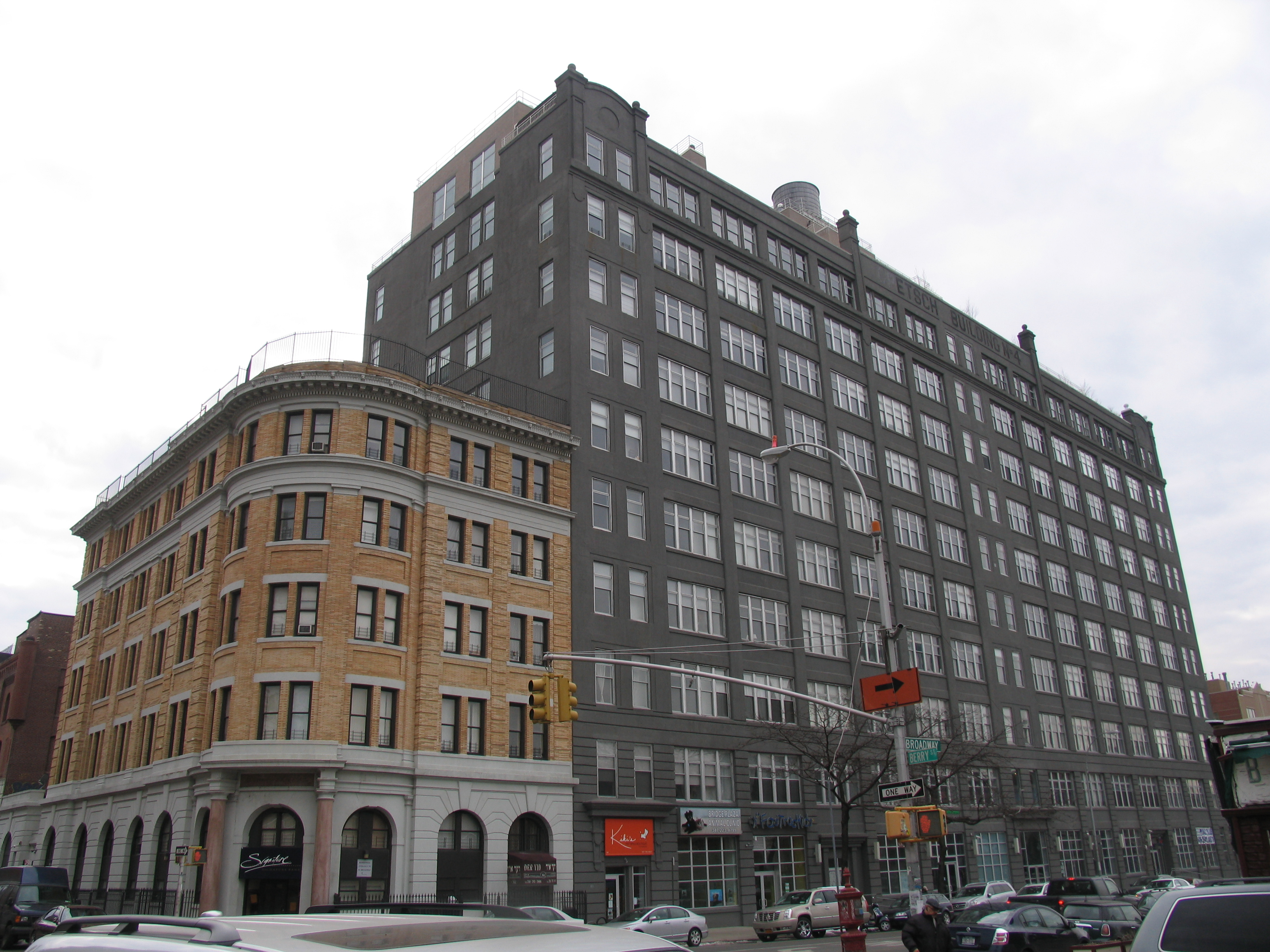
In 2003, Karl Fischer oversaw the conversion of the Williamsburg, Brooklyn Gretsch factory building to condos.

Karl Fischer (February 22, 1949 – March 12, 2019) was a Hungarian-born architect with practices in Montreal, Quebec, Canada and New York City.

== Career and firm ==
A graduate of the McGill University School of Architecture, with both Bachelor of Science in Architecture (1971) and Bachelor of Architecture (1972) degrees, Fischer established his Canadian practice in 1984 and an office in New York City in 1999. Fischer was licensed in both Canada and the United States.

Fischer and his wife Pamela funded the CA$2,000 Karl Fischer Scholarship at McGill University, for students who have "...demonstrated excellence in the development of pragmatic solutions to architectural problems."

== Works ==
=== Completed ===
- Gretsch Building (2003) – Conversion of a former Gretsch Musical Instruments factory into 130 luxury condominium units (60 Broadway, Williamsburg, Brooklyn).
- 20, 30 & 50 Bayard Street (2005–07) – Locally known as "Karl Fischer Row" or "Hot Karl Row", these multifamily buildings in Williamsburg, Brooklyn rise high over the southern edge of McCarren Park. 20 Bayard is a new 17 story building with 56 units, 30 Bayard is a new 12 story building with 40 units, and 50 Bayard is a 4-story renovation and 6 story addition with 70 units.
- Park Plaza (2002) – New $40-million, six-building development at 523 Kent Avenue in Williamsburg, Brooklyn. 182 apartment units, designed for Hasidic residents.
- The Powerhouse (2005–07) – Residential conversion and 4 story addition to a former Pennsylvania Railroad power station in Long Island City, Queens.
- Schaefer Landing (2005) – 350 unit, 530,000-square-foot (49,000 m^{2}) residential development on the East River in Williamsburg, Brooklyn, comprising one 25-story tower and one 15-story tower.
- Slate Condominium, 165 West 18th Street, New York, NY
- American Tract Society Building, 150 Nassau Street, New York, NY
- Vitre, 302 East 96th Street, Yorkville

=== Works in progress ===
- 100 Luquer Street – new 11-story residential building in Carroll Gardens, Brooklyn.
- 100 Parkside Avenue – new 270-unit mixed condo/rental building in Prospect Park South, Brooklyn on the site of the former Caledonian Hospital.
- Tom Condos, Montreal
