= North Bay 69 =

Forest fire in Canada

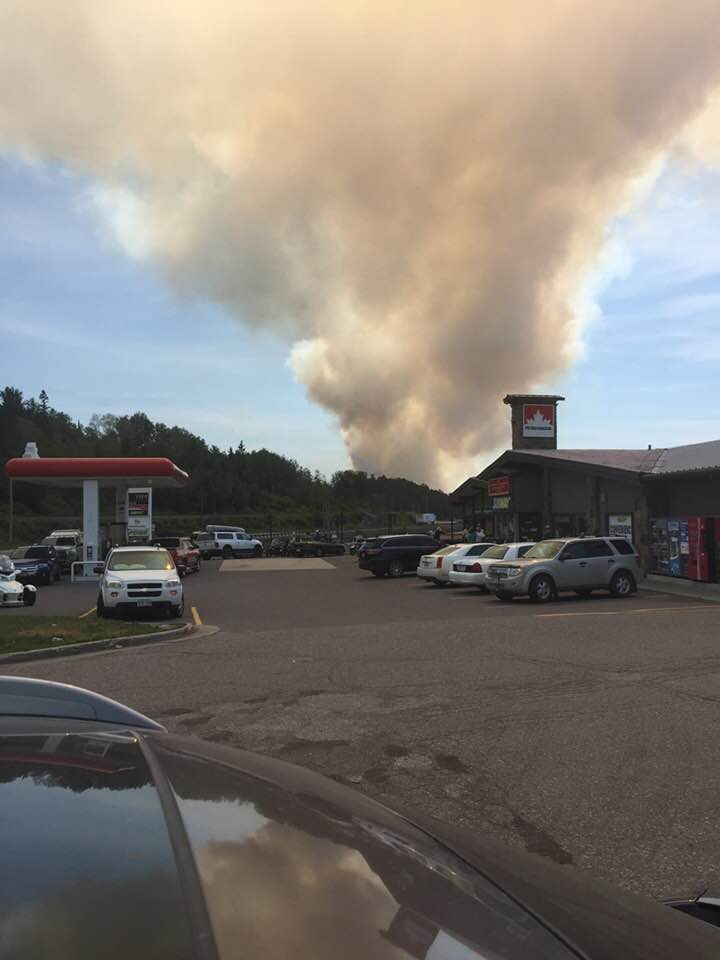
- North Bay 69 on July 8, 2018
- Date: July 8 – August 15, 2018
- Location: Temagami, Ontario, Canada
- Coordinates: 47°01′50″N 79°50′10″W

Statistics
- Burned area: 221 hectares (550 acres)

Ignition
- Cause: Lightning

Map
- Location of fire in Ontario

North Bay 69 was a forest fire burning in Strathcona Township of Temagami, Ontario, Canada. The fire, which was started by a lightning strike, was reported on July 8, 2018 and threatened the nearby town of Temagami, as well as forced evacuation of some residents along Highway 11 south of the town. North Bay 69 was extinguished on August 15, leaving behind a burned area measuring 221 hectares (550 acres).

== Events ==
Three intense thunderstorms took place in the North Bay District with little accompanying rain between June 30 and July 6, 2018 that resulted in several wildfires throughout the North Bay Fire Management Area. North Bay 69 was discovered on July 8 in Strathcona Township, 6 km (3.7 mi) southeast of the town of Temagami. It was approximately 15 hectares (37 acres) in size and posed an imminent threat to areas in front of the wildfire's path, resulting in 20 homes being evacuated south of the town between Finlayson Point Provincial Park and Jessie Lake.

By July 9, the town of Temagami became very smokey and a voluntary notice had been issued for the town to evacuate. Some residents with respiratory issues had already voluntarily left by this time. North Bay 69 had grown 100 hectares (250 acres) in size by July 10 and the town of Temagami was still on a voluntary evacuation notice. Sprinkler systems were installed at the Temagami marina to protect structures from the wildfire. Fire crews were actively battling the wildfire but North Bay 69 was still not under control on July 11.

Fire crews and heavy helicopters made good progress in reducing fire activity of North Bay 69 on July 12. The wildfire was remapped to reflect a more accurate size of 221 hectares (550 acres) on July 15, although it had not grown in recent days. The evacuation order extending south of the town of Temagami to Jessie Lake was downgraded to an evacuation alert. The status of North Bay 69 on July 17 was "being held" but was downgraded to "under control" on July 18. The status of North Bay 69 remained as "under control" on July 19. The Municipality of Temagami ended its declaration of emergency on July 24 and North Bay 69 was eventually extinguished on August 15.

== Impact ==
Inaccurate information regarding the dangers posed to Temagami by North Bay 69 in early July 2018 had a devastating effect on businesses in the community throughout the summer season. Affected businesses included Lakeland Airways, the Three Buoys houseboat operation and the Temagami Shores restaurant. In August, Darren Gareh, owner of Lakeland Airways and the Three Buoys houseboat operation, said "at this time of the year I would normally have 15 flights a day. But we’ve only got about five or six now." Steph and Mark Wagner, owners of the Temagami Shores restaurant, also expressed their struggles in August. "Right now, at this time of the year, we should be full," said Mark Wagner. Steph Wagner said, "there were a lot of misconceptions about what actually happened here" and that "it scared people".

== See also ==
- List of fires in Canada
