= 2018 Parry Sound forest fire =

Wildfire in Ontario, Canada

Parry Sound forest fire Parry Sound 33
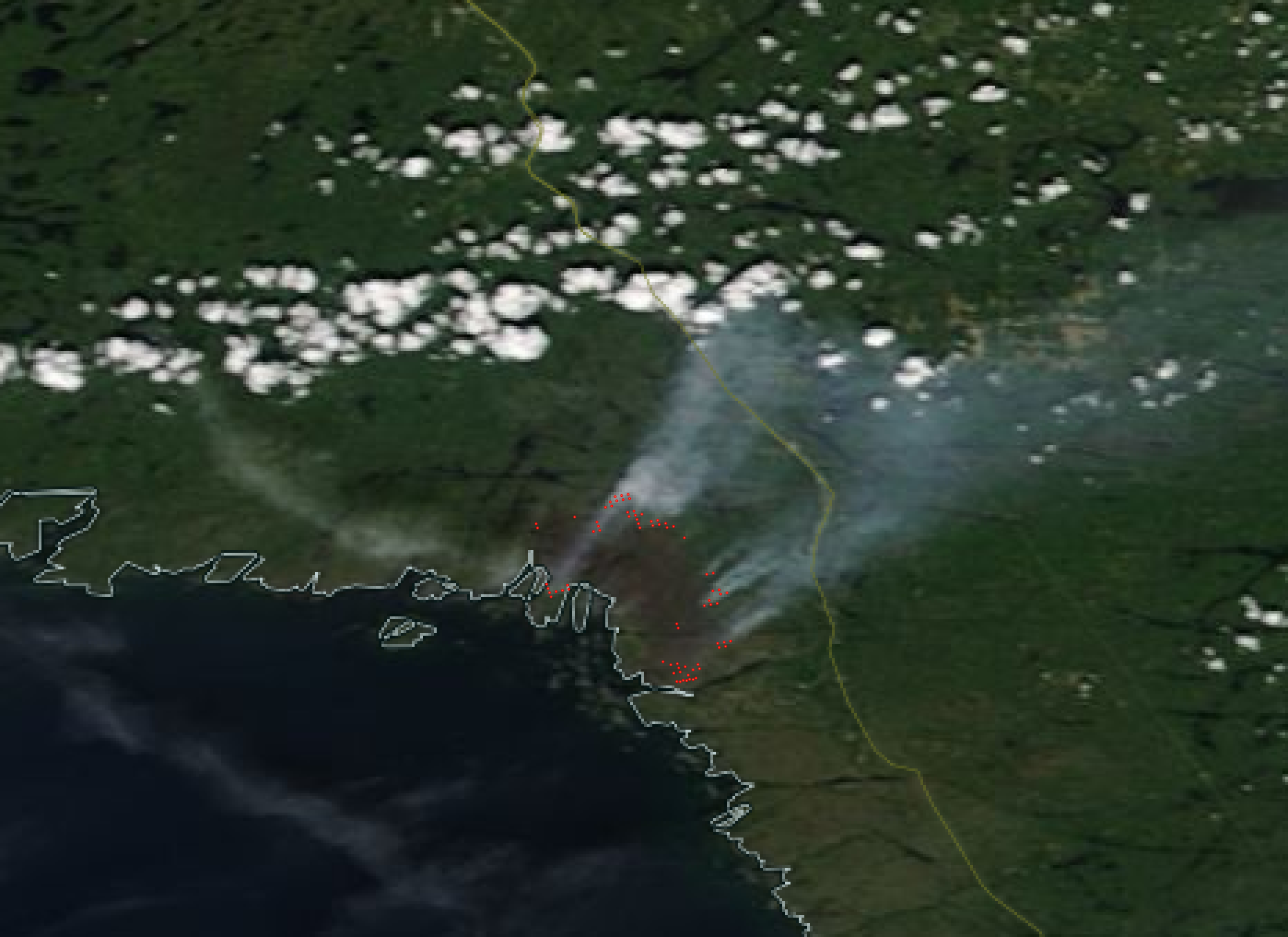
- 60m resolution showing the Parry Sound 33 fires (represented by the red dots) as they near the highway (the yellow line), July 30, 2018
- Date: July 18 - October 31, 2018; (ET)
- Location: Parry Sound District; Ontario, Canada

Statistics
- Burned area: 11,362.5 ha (28,077 acres)

Impacts
- Structures destroyed: 13 structures

Ignition
- Cause: Disabled ATV

The Parry Sound forest fire (officially designated as Parry Sound 33) was a wildfire in unorganized parts of Parry Sound District, Ontario, Canada.

== Progression ==
The fire was first discovered on July 18, 2018. The Ministry of Natural Resources and Forestry (MNRF), and the Ontario government ministry responsible for battling forest fires, began immediate efforts to contain the blaze. By July 23, 2018, the fire had covered 50 km^{2} (12,000 acres), forcing evacuations and a state of emergency in the community of Henvey Inlet First Nation, as well as evacuations of people in French River Provincial Park.

The fire grew to 67 km^{2} (17,000 acres) by July 26, 2018. By July 28, 2018, the fire was within 7 kilometres (4.3 mi) of Highway 69. By August 5, the fire had grown to 112.3 km^{2} (27,700 acres), but the fire was successfully contained within a few days after this. On October 31, 2018, the wildfire was declared extinguished by the Ministry of Natural Resources and Forestry. By the time the fire had been extinguished 7 structures were destroyed by the blaze

== Investigation ==
An investigation by the MNRF ruled that the fire was started by a disabled ATV near Henvey Inlet. This confirmed unofficial reports that construction crews working on the Henvey Inlet Wind Project were unable to contain a fire started by one of their vehicles. The ministry has decided not to raise charges against the construction company.

== See also ==
- List of fires in Canada
