= Donnie Creek fire =

2023 wildfire in British Columbia, Canada

- Part of 2023 Canadian wildfires
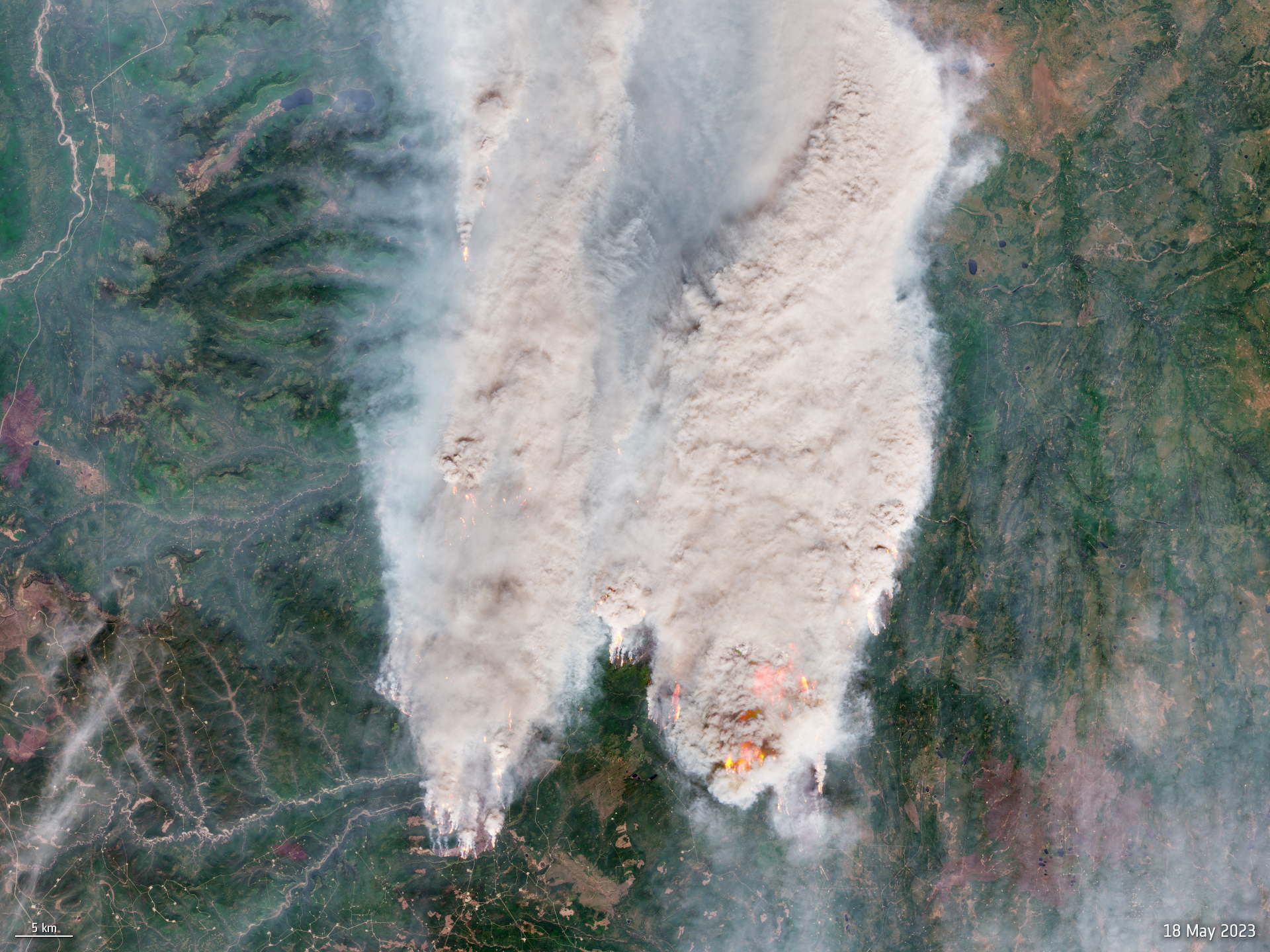
- Donnie Creek fire on 18 May, 2023
- Date: May 12, 2023 – August 2024
- Location: Near Fort Nelson, British Columbia, Canada

Statistics
- Burned area: 619,072.5 ha (1,529,761 acres)

Impacts
- Deaths: 1

Ignition
- Cause: Lightning

The Donnie Creek fire was a 2023 wildfire in the Canadian province of British Columbia. With a final size of 619,072.5 hectares (1,529,761 acres), it is the largest recorded wildfire in the province's history. The fire was caused by lightning and started on May 12, 2023. It started 136 kilometres (85 mi) north of the town of Fort Nelson in the northeast of the province. The fire burned throughout the year and would be a source of holdover fires in 2024. One firefighter was killed while working on the fire.

== Background ==
Western Canada had been in a decades-long warming and drying trend, influenced by anthropogenic climate change. An extremely dry and warm fall in 2022 caused very low moisture levels in the spring. A heat wave in May in northern British Columbia's boreal forests brought temperatures 6–10 degrees Celsius above normal levels. The fire was one of the early conflagrations in what would become the worst year of wildfires in Canadian history.

== Ignition and spread ==
The fire was discovered on May 12, and was determined to have been caused by a lightning strike. It exhibited rapid growth; at one point, the fire grew by 30 kilometres (19 mi) even after receiving 40 millimetres (1.6 in) of rain. By June 12, a month after discovery, the fire was 4,660 square kilometres (1,800 sq mi) in size, almost twice the size of the entire metro Vancouver area. By June 18th, the fire surpassed the 5,210 km^{2} (2,010 sq mi) 2017 Plateau fire to become the largest in the province's history. The fire continued to burn throughout the summer and fall, and smouldered underground during the winter. In May 2024, the Donnie Creek fire reignited as a "holdover fire", and would continue to burn into the summer of 2024. It was not declared out until August 30, 2024, more than a year after starting.

== Impact ==
Hundreds of residents were ordered to evacuate due to the fire. Communities in the Peace River Regional District, including Prespatou and Pink Mountain, received evacuation orders from the wildfire service. The area is part of several First Nations' traditional territories, including the Blueberry River, Prophet River, and Doig Creek First Nations. The fire destroyed hunting and trapping areas, and damaged sites that the nations had been working to rehabilitate after decades of damage from fossil fuel extraction.

The fire burned in the Montney Basin, an area of natural gas deposits. The area has extensive oil and gas operations and infrastructure. The fire affected 18 different fracking operations, causing companies to remove staff and shut down activities. The Alaska Highway runs through the region; BC Wildfire undertook prescribed burns to steer the fire away from the route which is the only paved road connecting communities in the area.

In late July, firefighter Zak Muise was killed after an accident involving his all-terrain vehicle north of Fort Nelson. He was one of six wildland firefighters killed in the line of duty in B.C. in 2023.
