= 2018 British Columbia wildfires =

Major wildfires in British Columbia, Canada

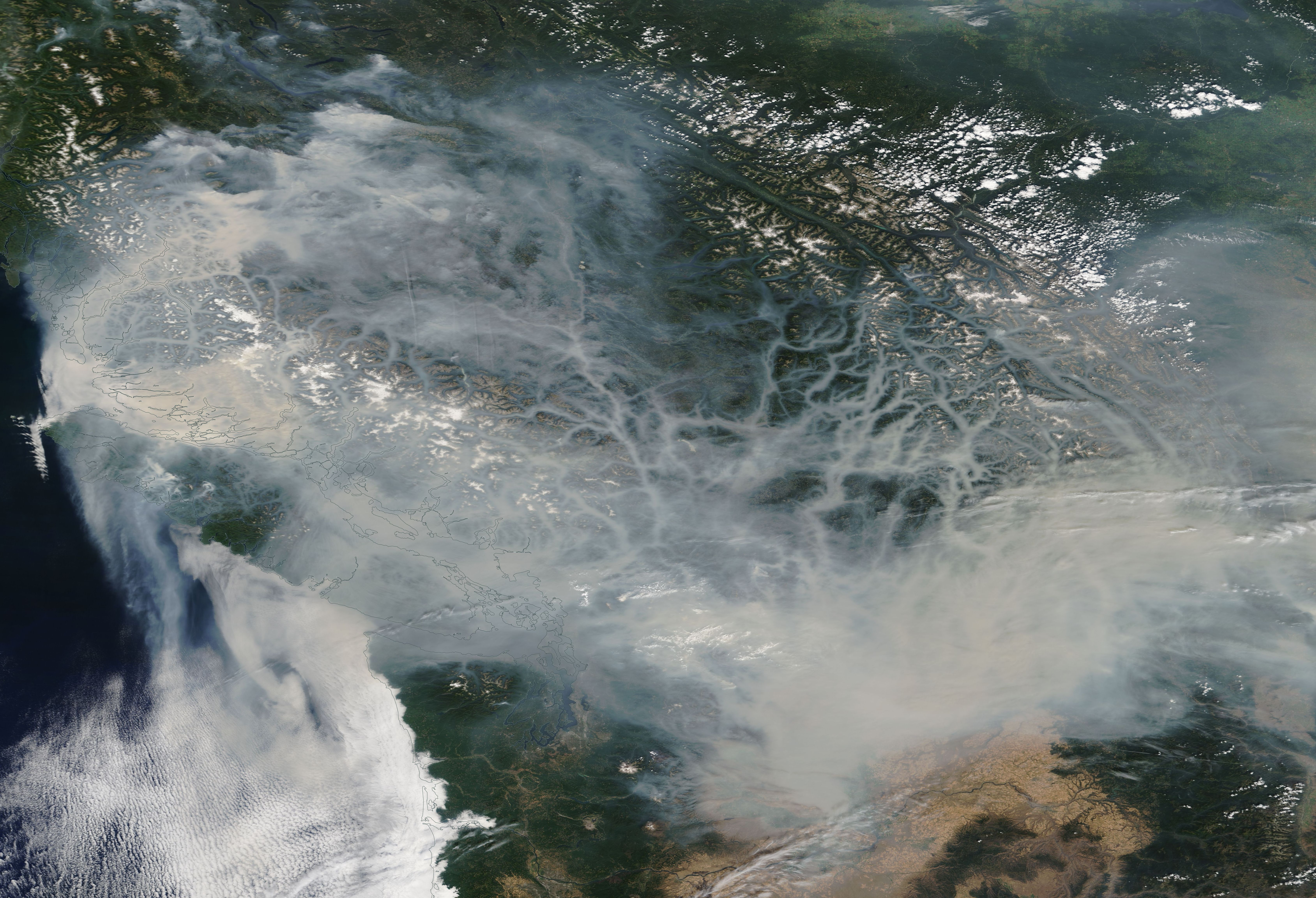
- Wildfire smoke from the Pacific to the Rocky Mountains and beyond, filling the BC interior and Eastern Washington; August 20, 2018
- Date: Evacuations: Ended, 2018 Provincial state of emergency: August 15, 2018 – September 7, 2018
- Location: British Columbia, Canada

Statistics
- Burned area: 1,351,314 hectares (3,339,170 acres) as of November 9, 2018
- Land use: Forest and residential

Impacts
- Deaths: Unknown
- Injuries: Unknown
- Structures destroyed: ~50 homes
- Cost: Unknown

Ignition
- Cause: Lightning and Human-Caused

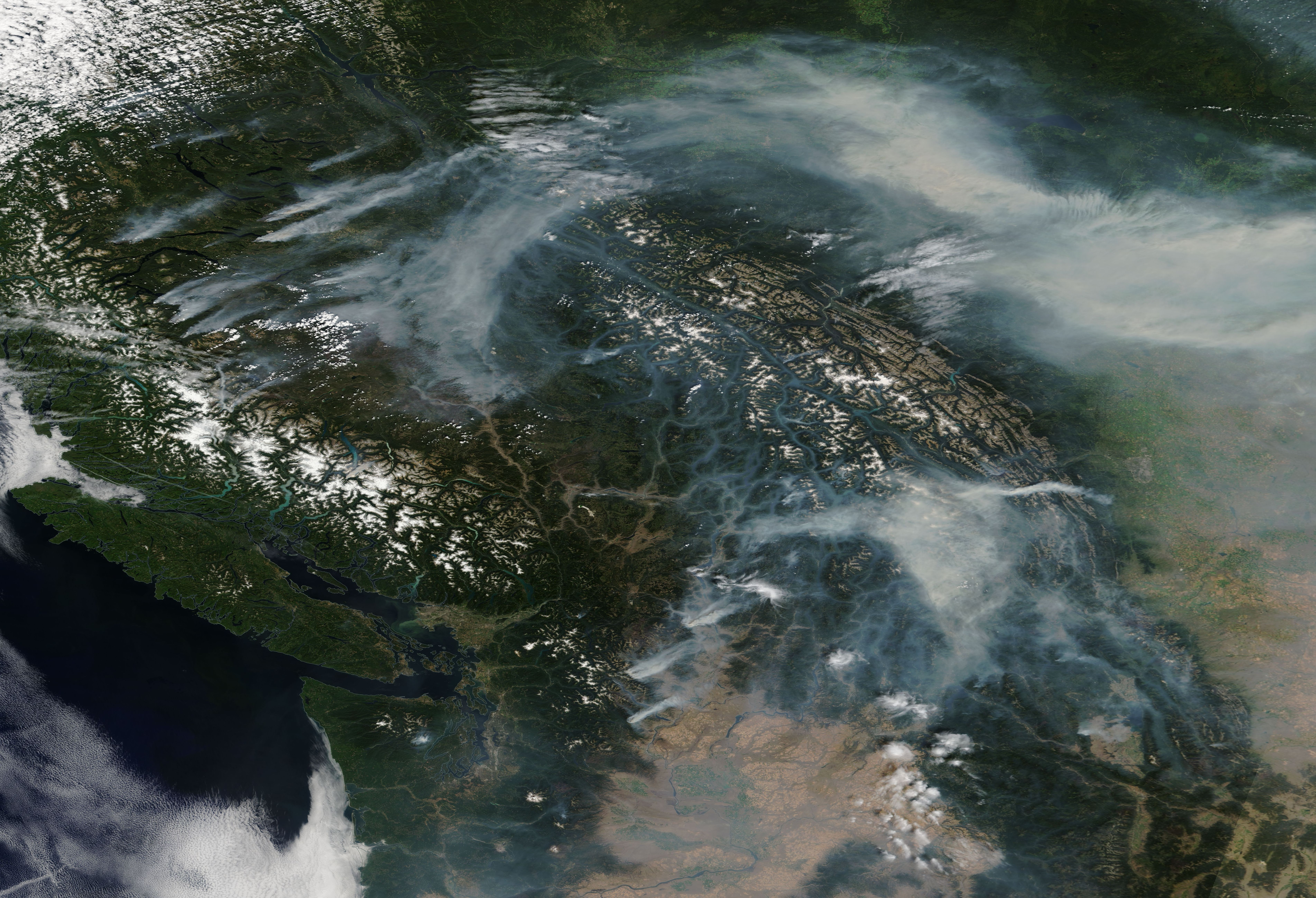
Wildfires over British Columbia and northern Washington on August 8

In the first half of 2018, British Columbia suffered more than 560 wildfires. By the end of the year, more than two thousand wildfires had burned more than 1,351,314 hectares (3,339,170 acres) of land.

Lightning caused the Comstock Lake fire, discovered on June 21. By July 6, it had grown to 27.5 square kilometres (10.6 sq mi) and still was not fully contained. At one point more than 200 personnel were fighting the fire complex.

The Tugwell Creek fire near Sooke grew to 85 hectares (210 acres), and was 10% contained by July 4. The fire threatened millions of honeybees at Tugwell Creek Honey Farm and Meadery. It was fully contained on July 9.

The Shovel Fire, started on July 27, burned at least 86,397 hectares (213,490 acres). It was still active as of August 20. Thick smoke slowed efforts to contain the fire.

A human-caused fire at Nanaimo Lakes, discovered on July 1, had burned 14.5 hectares in three days.

As of August 28, estimates put 2018's wildfire season as having the largest burn-area in a BC wildfire season, surpassing the historic 2017 wildfire season and its burn-area of 1,216,053 hectares). The total land burned in 2018 covered about ~1.4% of the area of the province.

Largest fires in 2018
Ranking	Fire	Size	Date discovered	Status	Ref
1	Tweedsmuir Complex fire	301,549 hectares (745,140 acres)	August 8	Out	
2	Johnny Creek Fire	156,775 hectares (387,400 acres)	August 4	Out	
3	Alkali Lake Complex fire	121,215 hectares (299,530 acres)	August 1	Out	
4	Lutz Creek Complex fire	100,799 hectares (249,080 acres)	August 4	Out	
5	Shovel Lake fire	92,412 hectares (228,360 acres)	July 27	Out	
6	Nadina Lake fire	86,767 hectares (214,410 acres)	July 31	Out	
7	Verdun Mountain fire	47,610 hectares (117,600 acres)	July 31	Out	
8	Silver Lake fire	23,042 hectares (56,940 acres)	August 5	Out	
9	Tommy Lakes	21,795 hectares (53,860 acres)	May 22	Out	
10	Island Lake fire	21,381 hectares (52,830 acres)	August 1	Out	
11	Chutanli Lake fire	20,813 hectares (51,430 acres)	August 1	Out	

== Smoke ==
Wildfires caused severe smoke to cover much of British Columbia. It has impacted tourism and cancelled flights. The smoke spread across Canada and as far as Ireland. In Prince George, British Columbia smoke orange sky at 8:40 AM, and 9:10 AM turns into midnight from wildfires. Then 3 PM in Grande Prairie, Alberta thick layered smoke plume generated by the fire which turned day into night during the afternoon of that day at the location.

== See also ==
- List of disasters in Canada
- List of fires in Canada
- List of fires in British Columbia
- List of wildfires
