= Plateau Complex fire =

2017 wildfire in British Columbia, Canada

Plateau Complex
- Part of 2017 British Columbia wildfires
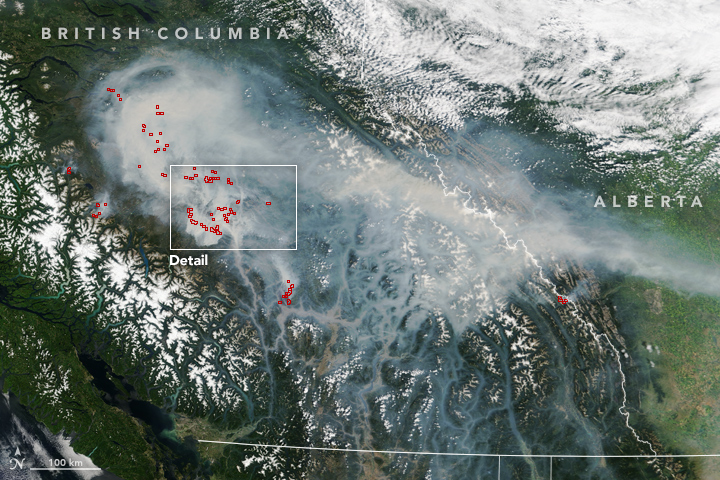
- Fires in the Cariboo before merging, July 18, 2017
- Date: July 7, 2017
- Location: Cariboo Regional District, British Columbia, Canada

Statistics
- Total fires: 19
- Total area: 545,151 ha

The Plateau Complex was a wildfire in the Canadian province of British Columbia in 2017. The complex was a result of the merging of 19 separate wildfires over the months of July and August. At a final size of 545,151 hectares (1,347,100 acres), it is the second largest fire in B.C. history. The fire burned in the Interior plateau in the Cariboo and Chilcotin regions, approximately 60 kilometres (37 mi) northwest of the city of Williams Lake.

== Background ==
The 2017 fire season in B.C. was, at the time, the most destructive in terms of area burned in the province's history. The Cariboo region saw high temperatures throughout the month of June, increasing the fire risk. The area had been severely affected by the mountain pine beetle epidemic, which had killed off significant amounts of lodgepole pine. This resulted in a very high Build-Up Index, a measure of available flammable material in forest areas.

== Ignition and spread ==
The first of the many fires that would become the Plateau Complex was noticed in the province's Cariboo region on July 7th. A large number of fires were sparked by a major system of thunderstorms that moved through the region between July 6th and 8th. The fire was detected inside Itcha Ilgachuz Provincial Park. The fires that would become the complex saw large growth at the end of July, and by mid-August, some had joined together. Some of the individual fires that burned into each other included the Chezacut, Tautri, Bishop’s Bluff, Baezaeko, Wentworth Creek, and Arc Mountain fires.

== Impacts ==
The Plateau Complex fire, as well as several other major fires in the same region (such as the Hanceville-Riske Creek fire and the Elephant Hill fire), led to a provincial state of emergency for a total of 10 weeks, the longest at the time. Five homes and 25 structures were destroyed by the fire. Logging is a major industry in the region; the fires caused a loss of approximately 22,000,000 cubic metres (780,000,000 cu ft) of green timber. Also lost were important habitats for bighorn sheep, old growth forests, and forests and facilities in provincial parks.
