= Saguenay Fire =

1870 forest fire in Saguenay–Lac-Saint-Jean, Quebec, Canada

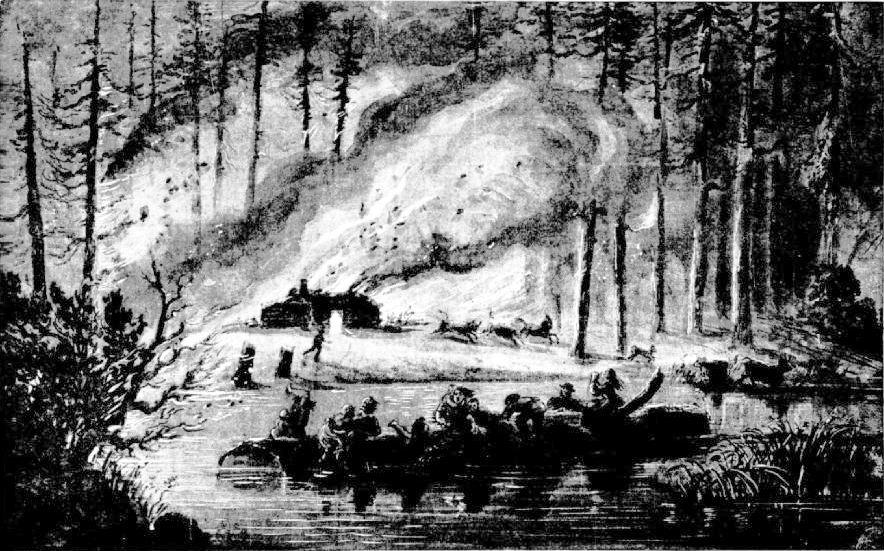
- Canadian Illustrated News - June 25, 1870
- Date: May 18–19, 1870
- Location: Saguenay–Lac-Saint-Jean, Quebec, Canada

Statistics
- Burned area: 400,000 hectares (990,000 acres; 4,000 km^{2})

Impacts
- Deaths: 7

Ignition
- Cause: Brush fire land clearing spread by felled dry trees and strong winds.

Map

Saguenay Fire was a forest fire in Saguenay–Lac-Saint-Jean area, Quebec, Canada, on Wednesday, May 18, 1870, which lasted for one day. It was one of the largest fires in the region. It burned a total area of 4,000 square kilometers (0.4 million hectares). Seven people were killed, many were injured, and hundreds of families lost everything they owned.

== Origin ==
The settlers in this region were clearing the land with brush fires. The controlled burn turned into a massive forest fire due to dry conditions, which was further fueled by felled trees and strong winds.

== Description ==
The wildfire spread rapidly, and in a few hours, it burned everything in the 150-kilometer region. Residents of the area did not get time to gather their valuables and were forced to take refuge in the nearest area of water. Seven people died in the fire, and one-third of the entire Saguenay region population lost their homes and valuable possessions. By May 19, the fire burnt itself out.

=== Optical Effects ===
The wildfire gave rise to unusual optical effects on 22 and 23 May 1870. The ‘strange’ appearance of the sun and sky was widely observed in Ireland and a few parts of British Isles.

== Consequences ==
Agriculture in the area was severely impacted. More than 500 farming families lost everything. The fire lasted for one day, but a huge plume of smoke particles propagated towards the east due to the upper winds.

== Benefits ==
The fire destroyed hundreds of miles of forests along its shores. The fire cleared the land for farming and opened up the Lac St.-Jean area. The fields after the fire were ready to be cultivated. It attracted many farmers. The fire helped in the growth of blueberries. Berry-picking has become a popular tourist activity in the region.
