= L'Isle-Verte nursing home fire =

2014 fire in Quebec, Canada

2014 L'Isle-Verte nursing home fire
- Location of Quebec in Canada
- Date: January 23, 2014
- Time: 12:35 am
- Location: Résidence du Havre, L'Isle-Verte, Quebec, Canada; 48.0170°N 69.3355°W
- Cause: Kitchen fire
- Deaths: 28 known + 4 presumed
- Injuries: 15
- Property damage: Nursing home, clinic and pharmacy destroyed
- Website: residenceduhavre.com

The L'Isle-Verte nursing home fire took place around 12:35 a.m. on January 23, 2014, at the Résidence du Havre nursing home in L'Isle-Verte, Quebec, Canada, killing 32 people and injuring 15.

== Casualties ==
The impacted wing of the building burned to the ground, leaving only the elevator shaft intact. A number of residents were taken to hospital, including 13 people who had carbon monoxide poisoning or fell ill. Officials said rescuers could not carry out a complete evacuation because of the intensity of the fire. Many victims used wheelchairs and walkers.

Twenty seven bodies were recovered during an initial search, which ended February 1. A Montreal coroner's lab was to identify the remaining five missing by forensic DNA analysis of bone fragments and remains from the site. As of January 21, 2015, two of these five were identified.

== Investigation ==
After talking to police, the lone overnight worker at Résidence du Havre, Bruno Bélanger, told Quebecor Media he is "95% sure" the fire was caused by a cigarette, lit by a resident he refused to let outside to smoke less than an hour earlier. He said black smoke was billowing above the ajar door of the man's second-floor room, room 206. When he tried to help, he "began to suffocate" and had to leave. On the way to safety, he rescued a man who had broken his leg by jumping from his balcony.

The all-wooden building was partially equipped with sprinklers in a firewalled annex but not in the original structure. The investigation was hampered by a thick (up to 40 cm) layer of ice on the ruins, the firefighting water exposed to temperatures around −35 °C. Three teams of investigators worked 19 hours on January 25, in around −18 °C weather, before breaking until 7 am the next day. The teams started by chopping the ice, later bringing in ship de-icing equipment and using steam to melt ice to avoid further damaging any bodies.

Officially, investigators found the first tangible clues of a cause on January 31 but disclosed nothing; police claimed it could take months to determine what happened. Fifty workers, an electrician and a chemist investigated the wreckage, armed with a search warrant in case evidence of criminal negligence was discovered. In late March, police investigators claimed the fire started in the kitchen, dismissing the theory of a cigarette causing the blaze. Suspecting negligence, police asked Bélanger to take a polygraph test; he declined.

The building's owners continued to cite a cigarette in an individual rooms as the fire's probable cause and called for a public enquiry. A lawsuit against the municipality of Île-Verte claimed $3.8 million on behalf of Promutuel Insurance, the Résidence du Havre and its owners, alleging that the fire brigade took fifteen minutes to arrive, was ill-equipped, was slow to call for backup from neighbouring municipalities and that Île-Verte had no evacuation or emergency plans in place. Roch Bernier and Irène Plante removed their names from the suit in December 2014; the insurer's intentions are unknown.

A commission of inquiry (la Commission d'enquête sur la tragédie de L'Isle-Verte) conducted hearings in December 2014; both the Sûreté du Québec and the coroner rejected Bruno Bélanger's theory of a cigarette fire in an individual room, citing evidence that the blaze originated in the main-floor kitchen and spread laterally.

A 141-page coroner's report issued February 12, 2015 cited a lack of adequate evacuation and emergency plans, a lack of personnel on duty at night trained to help residents in case of emergency, delay in the transmission of alarms, delay in firefighters arriving on-scene, delay in requesting backup from adjacent municipalities and questionable management and execution of operations once firefighters arrived.

== Aftermath ==
Québec's building code currently requires sprinklers in existing buildings only if they are high-rise (Résidence du Havre was three stories) or house only non-autonomous residents (many who perished in l'Isle-Verte were semi-autonomous). Few staff are on duty overnight as residents sleep, despite evacuation of seniors being complicated by their limited mobility (many are in walkers or wheelchairs), heavy medication or conditions such as Alzheimer's disease. Medical oxygen use further increases the danger from structural fires.

The only province to have legislated a retrofit of sprinklers in all elderly homes is Ontario, and installations under that law (enacted Jan 1, 2014) could take several years to complete. Fire safety experts and groups such as the Canadian Association of Retired Persons, Ontario Retirement Communities Association, l'Association Québécoise de Défense des Personnes Retraitées et Préretraitées and the Canadian Association of Fire Chiefs have called for more stringent fire precautions including mandatory sprinkler installation. As of 2014, 54% of Québec's private homes for the elderly have no sprinklers. Québec health minister Réjean Hébert has suggested that requirements be strengthened to put sprinklers into homes for semi-autonomous elderly.

The lack of an emergency plan has also been cited by one of the owners, along with the failure to open a main door which is locked at 10:30pm nightly to prevent Alzheimer's patients from wandering away.

The requirement that only one staff member be on duty overnight per hundred residents is also being questioned; Résidence du Havre kept two staff on duty, but emergency plans rely on firefighters to remove residents from each room and the fire spread too quickly for firefighters to reach many of the occupants.

Coroner Cyrille Delâge, in his February 2015 report, recommended better fire-detection tools (including visible and audible smoke-detector alarms) in seniors’ residences, heat sensors, automated sprinklers and an alarm system linked to the region's 9-1-1 network. Fire fighting backup from adjacent municipalities should have been called at first word that a residence with elderly inside was burning, without first waiting for local firefighters to arrive. Sprinklers should be retrofitted to existing retirement residences; staff should be trained in emergency and evacuation procedures.

Some not-for-profit retirement homes in Québec's villages have no one on duty overnight.

In response to the coroner's report, Minister of Labour Sam Hamad announced that Québec would require sprinklers be retrofitted to old folks' homes with ten or more residents.

== See also ==
- Blue Bird Café fire
- Knights of Columbus Hostel fire
