= Richardson Fire =

2011 Forest fire in Alberta, Canada

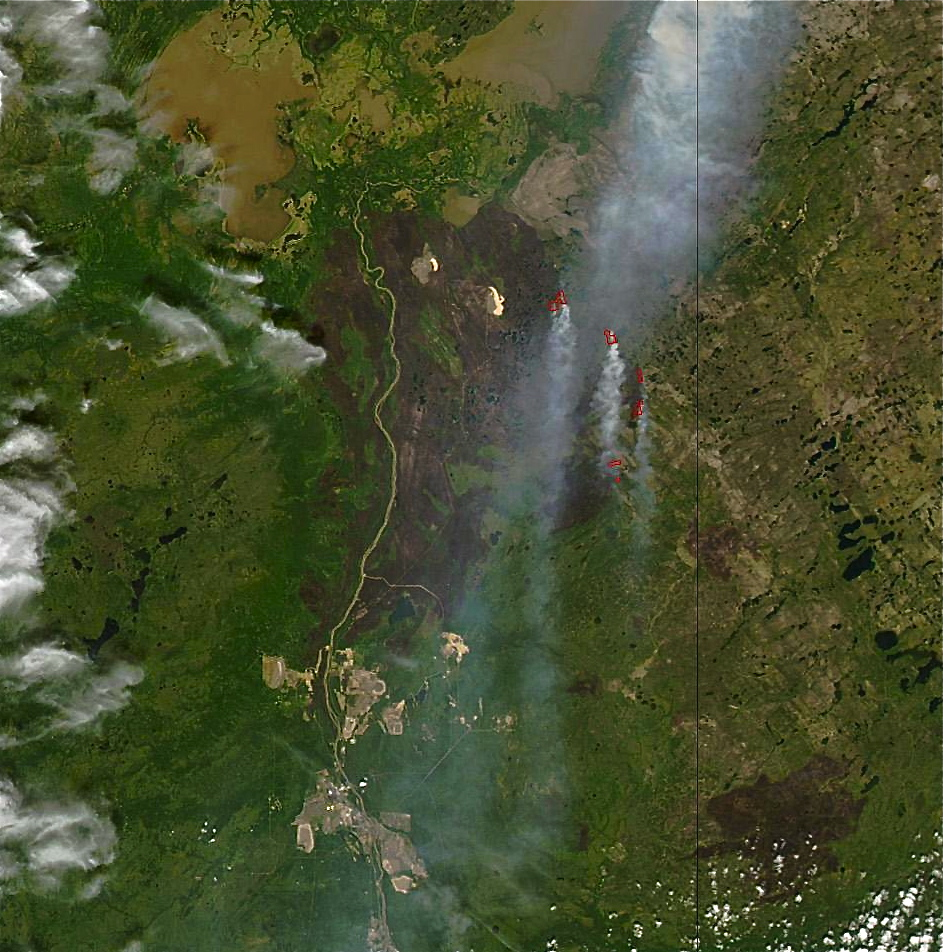
- Date: May 15, 2011 – September 2011
- Location: Richardson Backcountry, north of Fort McMurray, Alberta, Canada

Statistics
- Burned area: 705,075 hectares (1,742,280 acres)

Impacts
- Cost: $350-450 million ($480 million to $617 million in 2025 dollars)

Map
- Perimeter of Richardson Fire (map data)

The Richardson Fire (also known as the Richardson Backcountry Fire) was a 2011 forest fire in the Canadian province of Alberta. It was located north of the city of Fort McMurray in an area known as the Richardson Backcountry. The fire started in mid-May 2011, and burned over 700,000 hectares (1,700,000 acres) of boreal forest. It threatened facilities in the Athabasca oil sands, and resulted in several evacuations and shutdowns. Firefighting efforts included agencies from several Canadian provinces as well as international crews. The Richardson fire was the largest fire in Alberta since the 1950 Chinchaga Fire, and the second largest recorded fire in the province's history.

== Cause ==
Alberta government representatives have not pinpointed the source of the fire, but have stated that it was “almost certainly the result of human activity”. Several small fires were started in the region north of Fort McMurray on May 15. This was the same day that the destructive Slave Lake fire started to the west. Five of these fires would grow into large burns, including the Richardson fire, and were named the Bitumont Complex in late May. Extremely dry conditions, high winds, and above-normal temperatures allowed these fires to spread rapidly.

== Bitumont complex ==
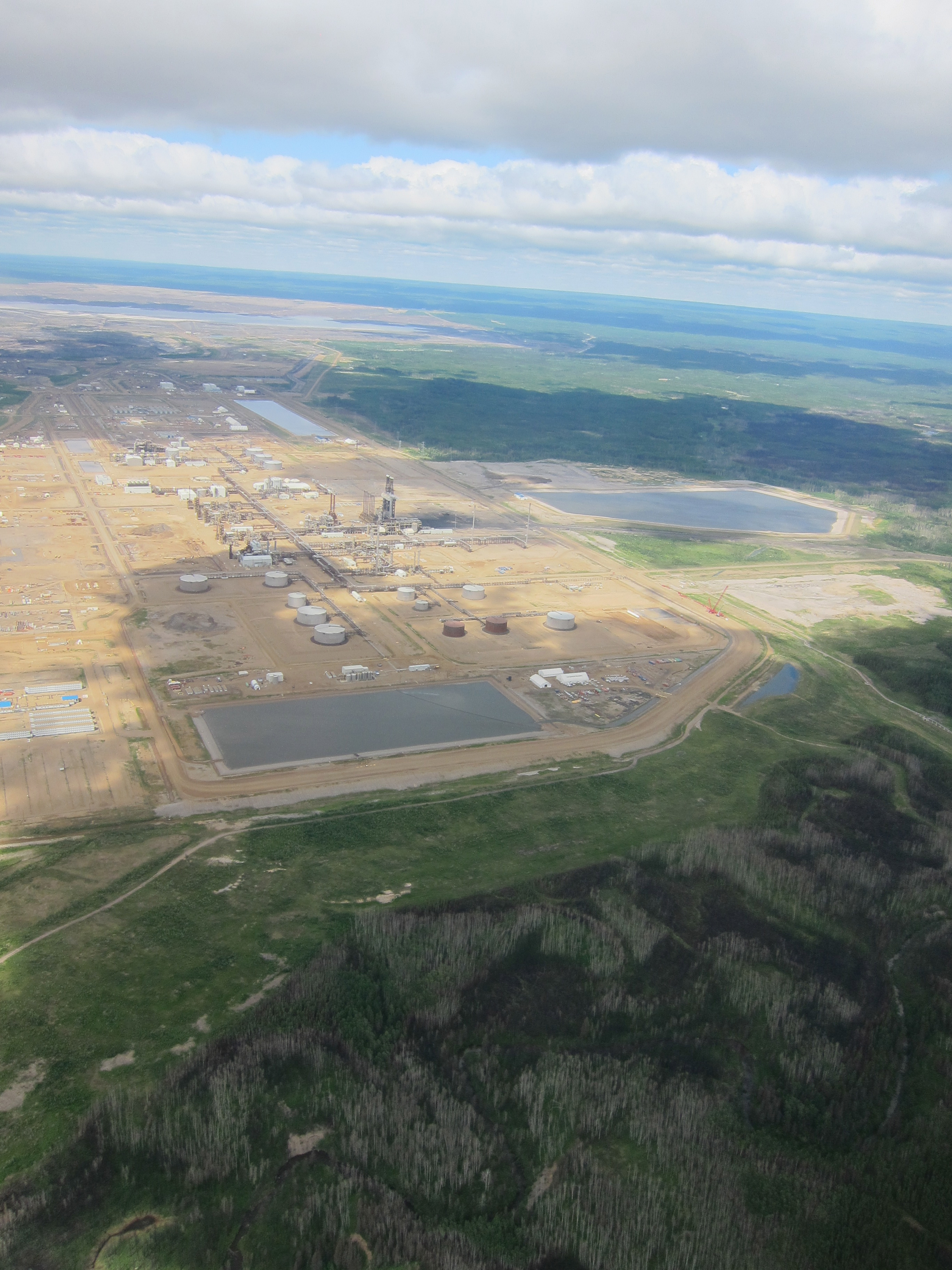
CNRL plant with burn in foreground

The first of the complex fires to threaten oil sands mining and extraction operations was the Kearl Lake fire, designated MWF 030. This fire caused work stoppages at Imperial Oil's Kearl site near the settlement of Fort McKay, affecting over 3000 employees. A fire in the Richardson backcountry area, designated MSW 007, joined with several smaller fires, including Fire 030, in early June. The southern flank of the fire burned into the Canadian Natural Resources Limited (CNRL) "Horizon" plant, causing the evacuation of thousands of employees and a shutdown of the plant. The fire eventually caused damage to the facility and lost revenues totaling $350 to $450 million Canadian dollars.

At a final size of approximately 700,000 hectares the Richardson fire would become the largest fire in Alberta's modern history, and the second largest recorded fire after the 1.5 million-hectare Chinchaga Fire of 1950. As the 1950 fire started in British Columbia and spread to Alberta, some sources classified the Richardson fire as the largest in Alberta history.

== Suppression efforts ==
Early control efforts on the complex were unsuccessful due to dry conditions and high winds. Suppression activities were focused around the oil sands facilities and the settlement of Fort McKay on the southern flank of the fire. Back burning operations were conducted to remove unburned fuel and direct the fire. Over 850 personnel and 40 helicopters were assigned, in addition to bomber groups from throughout the province. Crews from across Canada and a small contingent of Mexican firefighters worked on the complex. Control lines were constructed using bulldozers and other heavy equipment.

Despite the extensive resources, containment was not achieved until late June, when rain and cooler weather entered the region. Areas of the fire, especially on the eastern flanks, were allowed to burn into July and August due to the absence of human settlements or oil facilities in those places.

== See also ==
- 2016 Fort McMurray Wildfire
