= Knights of Columbus Hostel fire =

1942 structure fire at a hostel in St. John's, Newfoundland

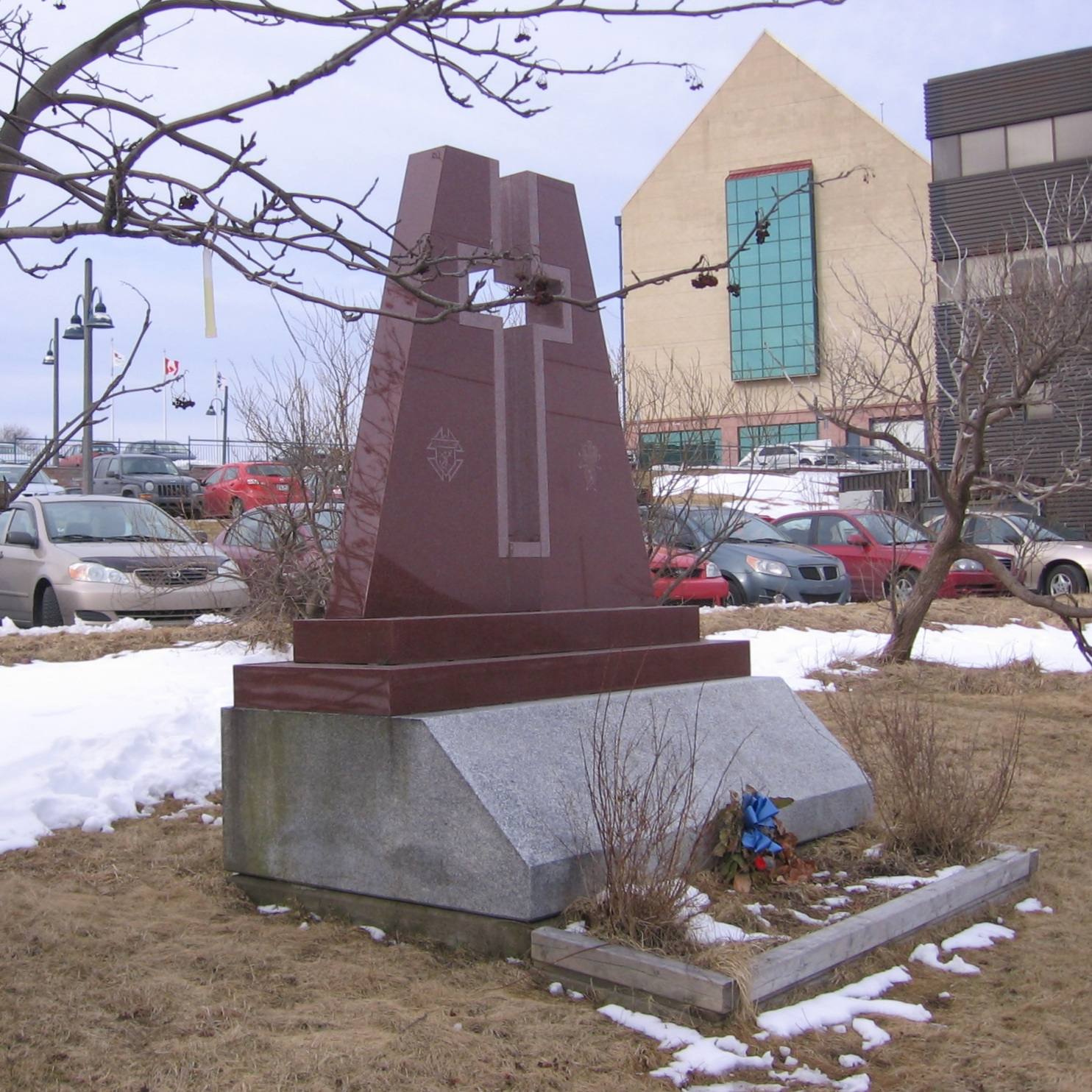
- Memorial on the site of the Knights of Columbus Hostel fire, Harvey Road, St. John's.
- Date: December 12, 1942
- Venue: Knights of Columbus Hostel
- Location: St. John's, Newfoundland
- Type: Fire
- Deaths: 99
- Injuries: 109

The Knights of Columbus Hostel fire was a structure fire that occurred on December 12, 1942, in St. John's, Newfoundland in a hostel operated by the Knights of Columbus, a Roman Catholic fraternal organization. A total of 99 people were killed, 80 of whom were military personnel. 109 others were critically wounded.

Taking place during World War II, the fire is believed by many to have been an incident of enemy sabotage orchestrated by agents of Nazi Germany.

The area was a centre of military personnel and activities, including soldiers, sailors, and air forces. Within a few weeks, other suspicious fires or their makings occurred in St. John's that winter, at sites frequented by military personnel.

== History ==
A large military presence had developed in St. John’s from the outset of World War II. The capital of Newfoundland had 60,000 residents at the time. Thousands more military personnel entered the area, representing three jurisdictions. In addition to local forces, personnel from several foreign countries passed through St. John's, as it became an important staging point for trans-Atlantic convoys.

The Dominion of Newfoundland, which did not confederate with Canada until 1949, was represented by the Newfoundland Militia, billeted at Shamrock Field. Canadian national forces, including air force, were stationed at Torbay and Gander. The air force began to supply protection from German U-boats as far as the Grand Banks.

The United States was building a series of bases in Newfoundland. The 1600-acre American Army base, Fort Pepperrell, was built on the shores of Quidi Vidi Lake, on land leased for 99 years from the Newfoundland government. Thousands of American servicemen were stationed in St. John’s.

Warships filled the harbour, and navy men and merchant seamen also swelled the population of the capital city. Organizations and groups worked to provide safe recreation places for their off hours. The Knights of Columbus Hostel on Harvey Road was frequented by many servicemen. The Knights of Columbus during World War I had set up many centres in England and Europe for servicemen, and renewed that commitment in World War II.

St. John's had already been the site of enemy action: a Nazi U-boat off Bell Island sank two British freighters carrying iron ore. On 3 March 1942, U-587 fired three torpedoes at St. John's. One hit Fort Amherst and two more hit the cliffs below Cabot Tower. Two days previous, a Liberator aircraft out of Argentia flown by Ensign William Tepuni caught U-656, under Kaptänleutnant Ernst Kröning, on the surface in broad daylight, a mere 40 kilometres south of Trepassey, and destroyed it. This sinking gave rise to one of the most famous radio signals of the war - "Sighted Sub, Sank Same".

== Construction ==
The hostel had been built in December 1941 for $100,000 USD. It was described (in the post-fire enquiry by the Royal Newfoundland Constabulary) as a "sleeping, eating and recreation centre for servicemen". It included a reading room, a restaurant, toilets, showers, a dormitory where men could stay, and a recreation room. The centre entertainment space was a large auditorium equipped with both a stage for live performances and a projection booth for showing films. Weekly performances were broadcast from the hostel by radio.

The building was horseshoe-shaped and faced south toward Harvey Road. It was covered entirely by a gabled roof. Its main section was about 115 feet (35 m) long and 38 feet (12 m) wide, standing two storeys high. At each end, a wing extended north from the rear of the main section, with a courtyard behind the main section in the space between the wings. The east wing, also two storeys high and the same width as the main section, extended approximately 88 feet (27 m). The west wing was of the same dimensions, but only one storey in height.

== Fire ==
An estimated 350 to 500 people were attending the barn dance in the auditorium, where Biddy O'Toole's songs were broadcast. She was one of Uncle Tim's Barn Dance Troupe, which broadcast a weekly show from the stage. The fire and the actions of the patrons were inadvertently broadcast through the open microphones of the dance troop that were on stage. Around 11 PM, soon after the next act started, featuring Canadian soldier Eddy Adams singing "The Moonlight Trail", a cry of fire was heard. The crowd struggled to get out of the auditorium, but the lights went out due to the fire. The four exits had been blockaded for the blackout. A survivor of the fire also stated that the doors would only swing inwards to the room and not outwards, further causing individuals to be clustered and unable to escape.

By 11:07 p.m., officers patrolling outside claimed the sky was lit by the fire. At least two individuals., US Army Cpl Hoosier and RNC Constable Bartlett, entered the building in an attempt to help evacuate individuals overcome by smoke. The fire burned out of control that night, quickly destroying the $100,000 building. The fire department finally put out the flames about 2:30 a.m., but kept putting water on the fire to prevent any revival.

== Victims ==
A total of 99 people died, 80 of them Canadian, British and American servicemen, and 19 civilians. Another 109 persons were critically injured.

In a 1943 report, it was determined that women and girls were about a third of the attendees, and only about twelve women or girls were identified as deceased. Comparatively, eighty-seven men were identified as deceased, which seemed to showcase an effort to evacuate the women and girls first.

== Investigation ==
The investigation showed several faults with the building's design and operations, and a printed report of the investigation was published.

While the Knights of Columbus Hostel fire was being investigated, evidence of planned arson was found a few weeks later at the YMCA's Red Triangle Hostel, where rolls of toilet paper were packed into a hidden area. (Witnesses had testified to seeing paper trailing from cupboards of toilet paper rolls at the St. John's hostel.)

A fire broke out soon after at the USO Club in St. John's, but was contained. A fire at the suburban Old Colony Club resulted in four deaths. In a third incident, a lighted cigarette was put through a letterbox at 11 p.m. at the Knights of Columbus Hostel in Halifax, when servicemen were watching a movie.

Sir Brian Dunfield examined 174 witnesses a month later in the St. John's Court House, and guardedly concluded it was of "suspicious... incendiary origin". He called it "a classic case of the kind of flash fire which is built around a low-grade gas explosion. That, in my view, accounted for the great rapidity of the fire. It certainly looks as if an enemy agent was about." No one was ever prosecuted for these events. If speculation is accurate, these fires would be among the few successful Axis attacks on North America aside from U-boat attacks on shipping.

== Aftermath ==
The national government quickly responded, and Boston, Massachusetts sent relief and blood plasma. A joint funeral for the 80 soldiers and merchant marine men of the two nations and Dominion of Newfoundland was held, with thousands in the city turning out in their honor.

In 1991, the Knights of Columbus built a memorial to commemorate the event and the victims of the fire. US Army Cpl Hoosier was awarded for his bravery in attempting to save victims, and RNC Constable Bartlett was awarded the Kings Police and Fire Service Medal for his actions.

== Legacy ==
- District Fire Chief P.J. Wakeham wrote a novel based on the fire, entitled The Flaming Holocaust.

A chapter of Frank Rasky's book Great Canadian Disasters (1961) is devoted to this tragedy.

== See also ==
- Blue Bird Café fire
- L'Isle-Verte nursing home fire
