= August-September 2024 Ecuador wildfires =

- Location: Some places in Ecuador

Impacts
- Structures lost: Some houses and several wooded areas in Ecuador

Ignition
- Cause: Human negligence or arson (suspected)

In August 2024, multiple wildfires started in Ecuador. What they resulted from is currently unknown.

Some cities in Ecuador such as Loja, Quito and Guayaquil have been affected by forest fires to such an extent that the Peruvian government has been forced to send personnel and support aircraft to stop the forest fires.

More than 10,980 hectares have been affected by the scourges

== See also ==
- 2024 Brazil wildfires
- 2024 Peru wildfires
- 2024 South American wildfires
- 2023–2024 South American drought
- List of wildfires
