= 2024 Chilean wildfires =

2024 Chile wildfires
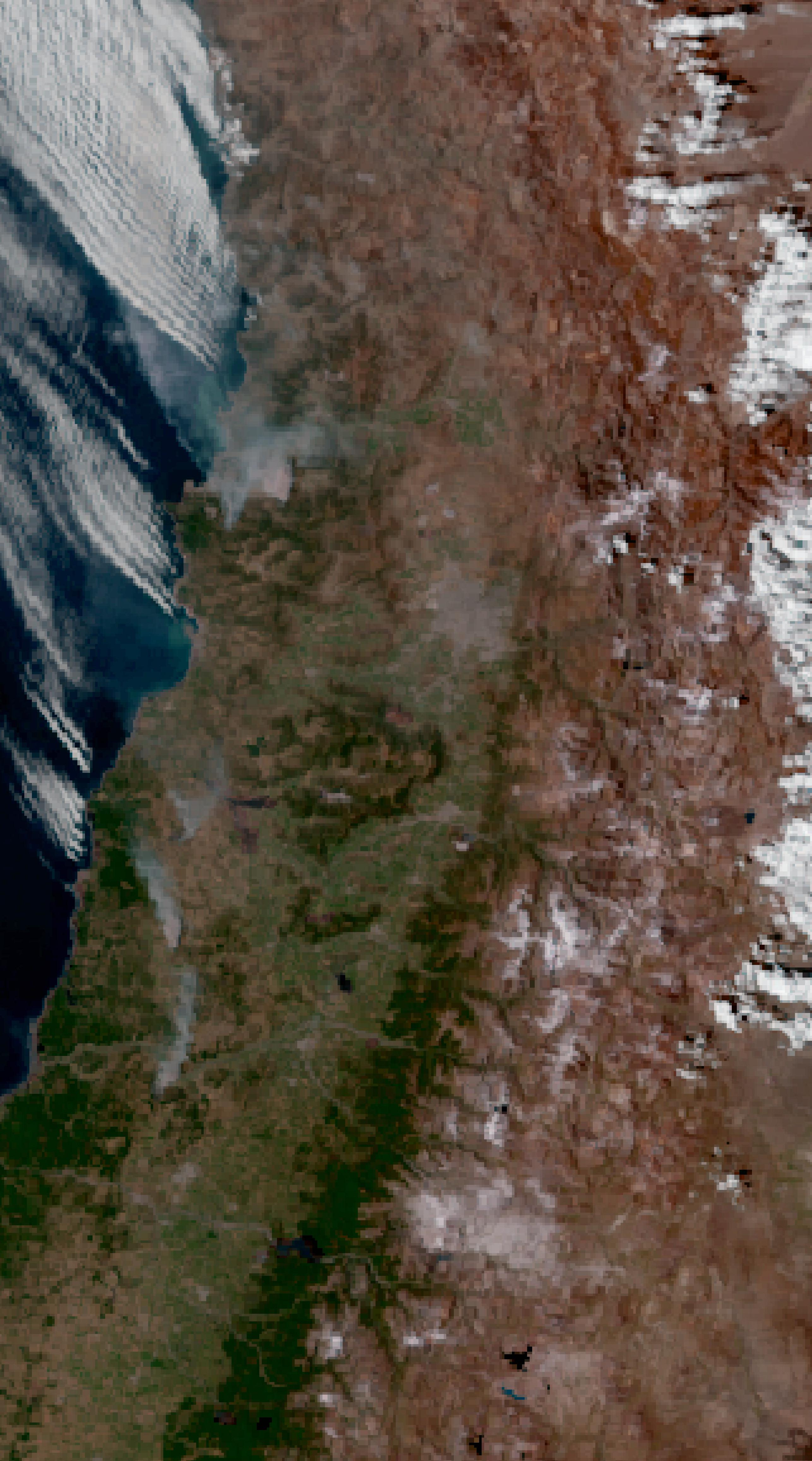
- Date: 1–5 February 2024
- Location: Chile; In the regions of: Valparaíso; O'Higgins; Maule

Statistics
- Total fires: 165
- Total area: 6,800 hectares

Impacts
- Deaths: 138
- Injuries: 1,100+
- Missing people: 370+
- Structures destroyed: 14,000+
- Cost: $4.39 billion (estimated)

Ignition
- Cause: Record heat; Chilean water crisis

In February 2024, a series of wildfires broke out in Chile, affecting multiple regions including Valparaíso, O'Higgins, Maule, Biobío, and Los Lagos. The most severe incidents occurred in the Valparaíso Region as of 5 February 2024. The Chilean government labeled the fires as the country's worst disaster since the 2010 Chile earthquake, and declared a two-day national mourning period.

== Overview ==
Deputy Interior Minister Manuel Monsalve reported on 4 February that there were 162 forest fires across central and southern Chile. The region experienced unusually high temperatures, reaching up to 40 °C (104 °F) in the past week, worsened by the El Niño phenomenon and a "mega-drought" that has affected the country over the last decade. Over 43,000 hectares of land were affected. As of 4 February, authorities had managed to bring 43 fires under control, while 34 were still being dealt with.

President Gabriel Boric suggested that some fires might have been intentionally started, a view supported by Valparaíso Region Governor Rodrigo Mundaca.

== Preceding fires ==
In January 2024, two forest fires prompted the National Service for Disaster Prevention and Response (SENAPRED) to issue a red alert. One occurred on 20 January in Lonquimay, Araucanía Region, and another on 26 January in Puerto Montt, Los Lagos Region.

On 22 January, a fire, named "Antiquereo 2", broke out on the boundary of Portezuelo and Trehuaco in the Ñuble Region. It was contained by 24 January after consuming 35 hectares (86 acres). SENAPRED responded by declaring a yellow alert in Portezuelo, marking the first alert of the year in the region.

By the end of January 2024, a fire originating in Florida, Biobío Region, spread to Quillón in the Ñuble Region. The "Casablanca" fire, covering 69.5 hectares (172 acres) in the Peñablanca sector, was extinguished through collaborative efforts between the Quillón and Florida fire departments.

In the last week of January 2024, a heatwave hit central Chile, with temperatures 10 to 15 °C (18 to 27 °F) above the weekly average. Anticipating an increased wildfire risk, the Meteorological Directorate of Chile issued a heat alert on 28 January, projecting temperatures of 36 to 38 °C (97 to 100 °F) in valleys and foothills of the central zone and 30 °C (86 °F) on the coast of Valparaíso, O'Higgins, and Maule regions.

== By region ==
=== Valparaíso Region ===
Thousands of people in the Valparaíso Region, which have had the deadliest wildfires, were urged to evacuate by the authorities.

At 3:25 on 2 February, a red alert was declared in Valparaíso Province due to a 1-hectare (2.5-acre) fire that affected the Las Docas road, south of Valparaíso. An hour later, it was announced that the fire affected 5 hectares (12 acres) of land. At 3:10 p.m., another set of fires was reported in the Lago Peñuelas National Reserve, affecting 30 hectares (74 acres). The fire was described as one of "rapid advance and high intensity", and caused the interruption of vehicular traffic on Routes 68 and F-718. Another fire was reported in Lo Moscoso at 3:54 p.m., affecting 8 hectares (20 acres) in the communes of Quilpué and Villa Alemana. At the same time, authorities placed the Marga Marga province on red alert.

SENAPRED reported that the Lo Moscoso fire extended to 80 hectares (200 acres) at 5:15 p.m., and ordered the evacuation of the Quebrada Escobares and Fundo El Rincón sectors of Villa Alemana. By then, the fire in the Lago Peñuelas Reserve had affected 480 hectares (1,200 acres). By 9:00 p.m., Los Andes, Petorca, Quillota, San Antonio and San Felipe de Aconcagua provinces were also placed on red alert. By 10:00 p.m. more than 6,200 hectares (15,000 acres) of land had been affected by the fires.

=== O'Higgins Region ===
On 31 January, authorities declared a Yellow Alert in response to active fires, including the "Maitén" fire in Navidad commune, which threatened homes and critical infrastructure, and the "La Aguada" fire in La Estrella commune. At 6:00 p.m., evacuations were ordered in La Patagüilla, La Aguada, El Maitén, and San Rafael. On 2 February, Senapred called for urgent evacuation from San Miguel de Viluco and Pihuelo.

By 2 February, the situation escalated significantly, leading Senapred to declare a Red Alert for the entire region, indicating greater severity of the fires and the need to mobilize all available resources for their suppression. Due to the severity of the forest fire in La Estrella, Senapred ordered the evacuation of the La Puntilla sector. At 2:00 p.m., evacuation orders were extended to other sectors of the commune. At 6:00 p.m., the evacuation of Pumanque commune was ordered. At 7:00 p.m., other sectors of La Estrella were ordered evacuated. By 6:00 p.m., it was reported that 3,455 hectares (8,540 acres) had been destroyed by the fires.

=== Maule Region ===
On 1 February, authorities issued a Yellow Alert for the communes of Pencahue and Curepto. This measure was taken in response to the "Hijuela 3 Las Palmas" fire, which at that time affected 650 hectares (1,600 acres) and represented an immediate threat to critical infrastructure, such as telecommunications antennas.

The situation quickly escalated, leading to an alert update on 2 February, forcing Senapred to declare a Red Alert for Curepto, Pencahue and Sagrada Familia. This decision was driven by the expansion of the "Hijuela 3 Las Palmas" fire to 850 hectares (2,100 acres) and its extreme behavior, which included the emission of sparks and proximity to populated areas, which represented a significant risk for local communities. During the same day, in response to the "Santa Laura" forest fire in the commune of Curicó reported at 5:54 p.m. and which initially covered 5 hectares (12 acres), Senapred declared a Yellow Alert for the commune. At 5:00 p.m, sectors of Curicó were ordered to evacuate. At 19:19, in response to the growth of the fire to 20 hectares (49 acres), the Yellow Alert was upgraded to a Red Alert. This led to the mobilization all available resources for its control, including the additional deployment of CONAF brigades, aircraft and the participation of the Carabineros de Chile to assist in the evacuation of the affected areas. At 10:39 p.m., the "Santa Laura" fire was declared "controlled" after affecting 30 hectares (74 acres), and prompted the downgrading of the Red Alert to Yellow by Senapred and CONAF, indicating that, although the immediate threat had been overcome, resources would remain on alert to respond to any change in conditions.

At 10:50 p.m., a red alert was declared in the commune of Hualañé, affecting 120 hectares (300 acres). The mobilization of resources in response to the Red Alert was considerable, including the participation of firefighters from several communes (Talca, Huaquén, Pencahue, Maule, San Javier and San Rafael), multiple CONAF brigades and private companies such as Celulosa Arauco, CMPC and Vista Hermosa, as well as the use of planes and helicopters from CONAF and Celulosa Arauco, among other land and technical resources.

=== Biobío Region ===
On 2 February at 2:19, a Red Alert was declared for the commune of Mulchén due to the "Mininco VIII" forest fire. This fire, which is being fought and has affected approximately 150 hectares (370 acres), is characterized by its proximity to populated areas, extreme fire behavior, including flying sparks and erratic winds. Until that time, a brigade from the CONAF is working at the site. On 3 January at 8:48 p.m., the alert was canceled after the fire was declared under control.

=== Araucanía Region ===
On 3 February, authorities declared a Red Alert for the commune of Galvarino in response to the "Colonia Suiza" and "Nilpe 4" forest fires. The "Colonia Suiza" fire affected 15 hectares while the "Nilpe 4" fire affected 5 hectares (12 acres).

=== Los Lagos Region ===
On 26 January, a forest fire began in the Los Lagos Region, which led authorities to declare a Yellow Alert after the "Camino San Antonio" fire was detected in Puerto Montt, initially affecting 6 hectares (15 acres). The situation quickly worsened, leading to the declaration of a Red Alert on the same day, at 8:36 p.m., in response to the growth of the fire to 63 hectares (160 acres) and its continued proximity to populated areas. This declaration mobilized an expanded set of resources, including CONAF brigades, firefighters from various locations, helicopters, and specialized machinery, to fight the fire effectively and protect the communities at risk.

In the following days, the Red Alert was maintained, reflecting the persistent severity of the fire, which consumed 546 hectares (1,350 acres) and then increased to 804 hectares (1,990 acres). During this period, preventive evacuations were carried out: on the morning of 28 January, 74 people were evacuated from 19 homes in the affected sectors, who returned to their homes in the afternoon of the same day. In addition, temporary shelters were set up and technical tables were held to coordinate the response to the fire.

The operations included the active participation of firefighters, CONAF brigades, technicians, helicopters managed by both CONAF and Senapred, and the use of highway machinery and private resources. The joint effort between different entities allowed the fire to be fought with a combination of ground and air strategies, including the use of Hercules C-130 aircraft for extinguishing operations. In addition, attention was paid to the safety of brigade members and the well-being of those affected by the fire, with the implementation of evacuation measures and the provision of temporary accommodation for those displaced from their homes.

== Casualties and damage ==
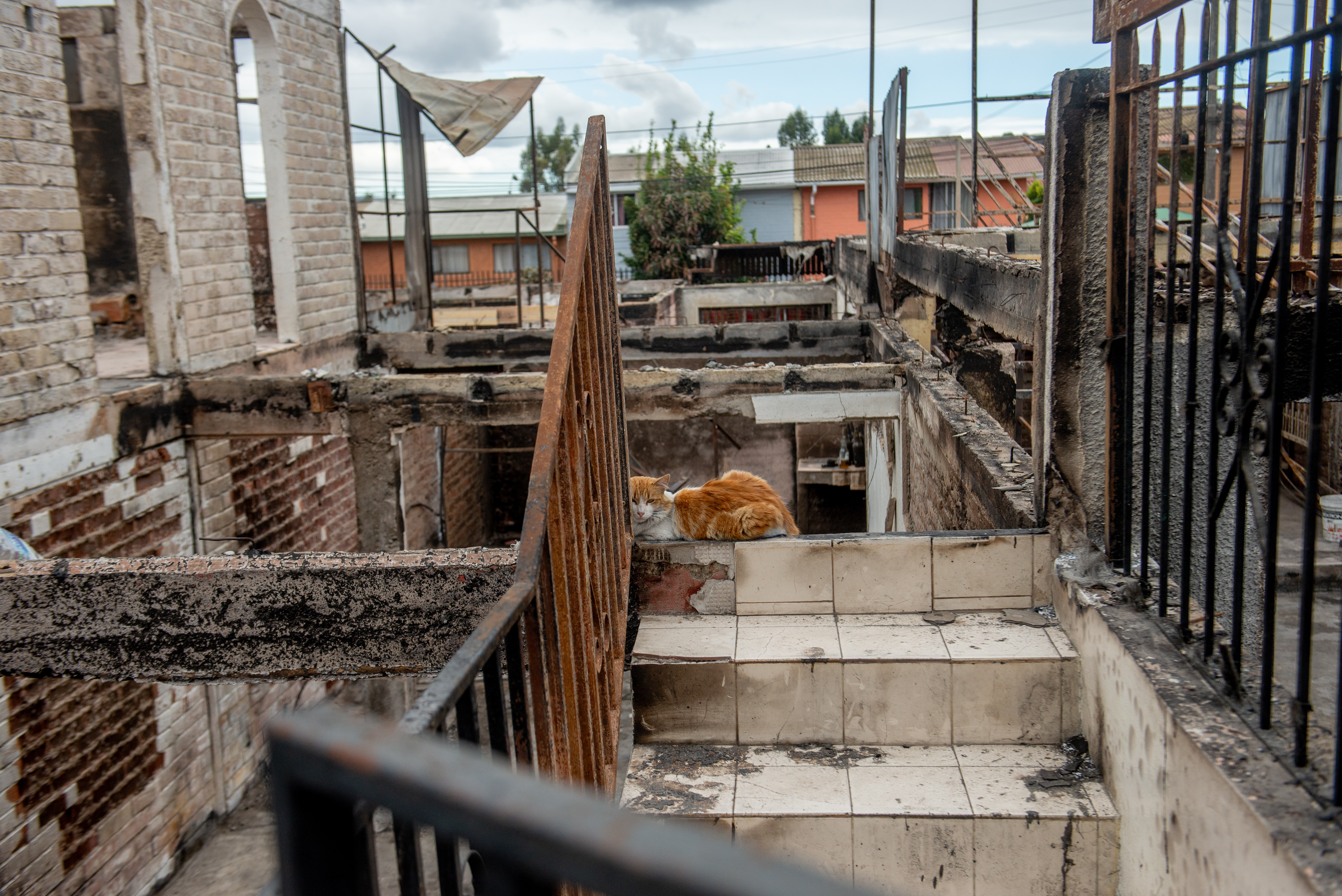
Burnt house in the El Olivar sector

A total of 131 people were killed in the fires, of whom 35 have been identified so far. The Chilean Forensic Medical Service said many bodies were found to be in bad condition and difficult to identify, prompting them to take DNA samples from people with missing relatives. At least 45 of the dead were found at the scene, while six others died of burn injuries in medical facilities. At least 14,000 houses were affected by the fires in Viña del Mar and Quilpué. Over 370 people were reported missing in the Viña del Mar area alone, while 1,600 others were displaced by the fires. The fires were regarded as the deadliest in Chile's history, and the deadliest disaster in the country since the 2010 Chile earthquake.

In Valparaíso, four hospitals and three nursing homes were evacuated, and two bus terminals were destroyed. In Viña del Mar, the city's botanical garden, which was founded in 1931, was destroyed by the fires, killing an employee and three of her relatives.

President Gabriel Boric said the death toll was likely to rise.

== Response ==
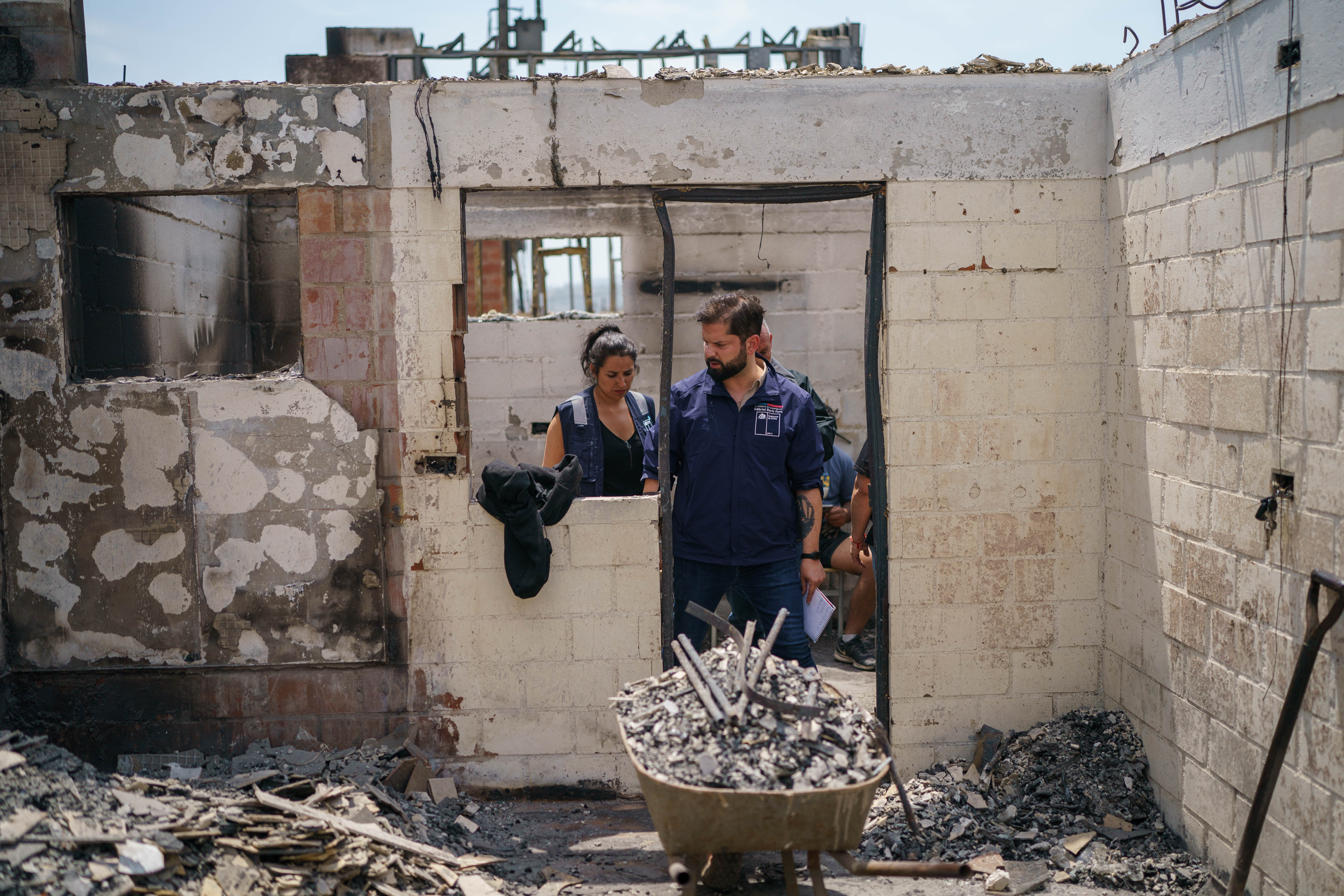
President Gabriel Boric inspecting damage site

The fires prompted the deployment of 31 firefighting aircraft and 1,400 firefighters, along with 1,300 military personnel, to aid in the emergency response. President Gabriel Boric ordered the deployment of more military units to help tackle the fires and urged citizens to cooperate with emergency teams. Additionally, a curfew was implemented in Viña del Mar, Limache, Quilpué, and Villa Alemana beginning at 09:00 pm on 3 February to facilitate the movement of emergency vehicles. Authorities ordered a ban on handling fire and other heat-producing machines in Valparaíso and Marga Marga provinces.

A state of emergency was declared on 3 February, while Boric declared two days of national mourning. On 3 February, Boric went in a flyover over the affected areas before visiting a school that had been converted into a shelter for those displaced by the fires. He also ordered the conversion of the official presidential summer residence, the Palace of Cerro Castillo, in Viña del Mar, into a temporary leisure center for affected children and the donation of furniture that had been used in the 2023 Pan American Games, as well as the forgiveness of the water bills of 9,200 households.

The health ministry issued a health alert over Valparaiso Region and ordered the suspension of elective surgeries. It also authorized the establishment of field hospitals and announced the hiring of medical students nearing the end of their studies to augment medical responders.

== Investigation ==
On 24 May 2024, following an investigation by the Investigative Police, Francisco Mondaca Mella (22), a volunteer of the 13th Fire Company of Valparaíso, and Franco Pinto Orellana (31), a brigade member of the National Forestry Corporation (Corporación Nacional Forestal, CONAF), were arrested. They were identified as the perpetrators of the fire, and later on 9 September, Elías Salazar Inostroza (39), a firefighter from the same company as Mondaca and also from the National Service for Disaster Prevention and Response (Servicio Nacional de Prevención y Respuesta ante Desastres, SENAPRED), was also arrested, classified as the intellectual author of the tragedy, all three are in preventive detention until the trial set for 30 October. On their phones, multiple evidences were found linking them to the same locations where the fires occurred (among them, several private text messages and GPS locations).

In July 2025, the Valparaíso Guarantee Court presented its accusation against nine individuals, including Mondaca, Pinto, and Salazar, along with firefighters Maximiliano Veliz Caballería, Claudio Gamboa Ortiz, Matías Cordero de la Fuente, CONAF workers José Jerez Camus and Ángel Barahona Troncoso, and SENAPEDR worker José Atenas Gaete. They were all charged with forest fires resulting in death, conspiracy, and environmental damage. Moncada was also charged with carrying and possessing homemade explosives. The Prosecutor's Office sought qualified life imprisonment (which in Chile, carries the possibility of parole after a minimum of 40 years) for all of the suspects. Their trial is set to begin on 9 March 2026.

== Reactions ==
The Viña del Mar Festival canceled its opening gala in mourning for the victims. Some participants such as Alejandro Sanz, Pablo Alborán and Maná sent messages of solidarity and announced donations.

The government of Mexico sent a team of 30 firefighters from the National Forestry Commission and 127 Army and Air Force personnel, together with 26 tons of food supplies. US President Joe Biden said that Washington "is in contact with our Chilean partners" and "is ready to provide necessary assistance to the Chilean people". Pope Francis called for prayers for the "dead and wounded in the devastating fires in Chile". The United Nations offered condolences and announced assistance.

== See also ==
- 2023 Chile wildfires
- 2023–2024 South American drought
- 2024 Argentina wildfires
- 2024 Brazil wildfires
- 2024 Peru wildfires
- 2024 South American wildfires
- 2026 Chile wildfires
- Wildfires in 2024
