= List of largest fires of the 21st century =

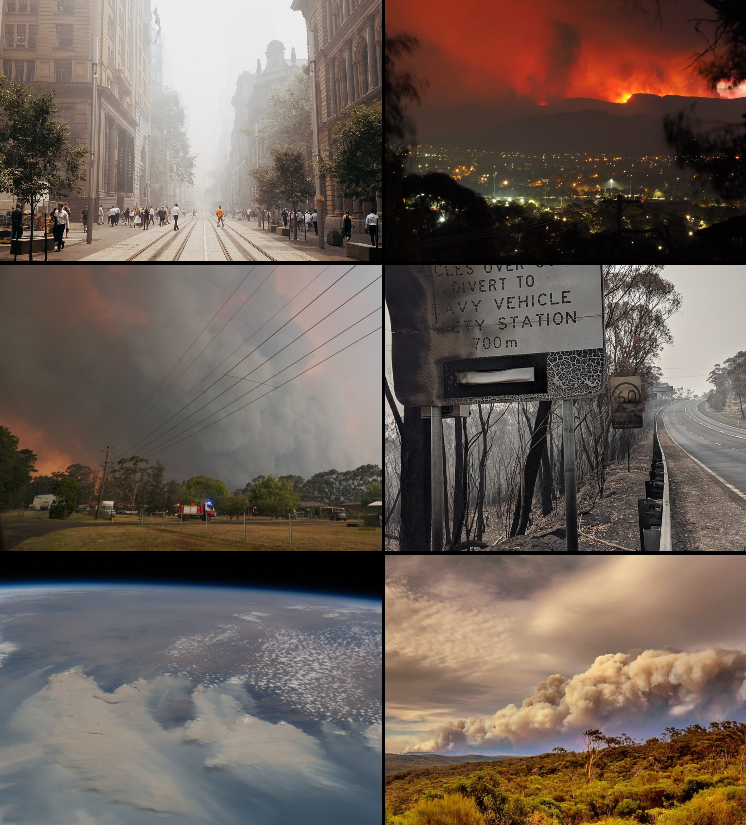
Montage of images related to the 2019-20 Bushfire season in Australia

This is a list of the largest fires by area burned of the 21st century.

Name	Country	Area burned	Deaths	Years	Ref.
2023–2024 Australian bushfire season	Australia	1,445,372 km^{2}; 558,061 mi^{2}	10	2023-2024	
2024 South American wildfires	Brazil; Bolivia; Chile; Colombia; Ecuador; Paraguay; Peru; Venezuela	858,669 km^{2}; 331,534 mi^{2}	154	2024	
2002–2003 Australian bushfire season	Australia	540,000 km^{2}; 210,000 mi^{2}	7	2002-2004	
2024 Brazil wildfires	Brazil	474,381 km^{2}; 183,160 mi^{2}	2	2024	
2019–2020 Australian bushfire season	Australia	243,000–398,000 km^{2}; 94,000–154,000 mi^{2}	33	2019-2020	
2003 Siberian taiga wildfires	Russia; China; Mongolia	200,000 km^{2}	0	2003	
2023 Canadian wildfires	Canada	184,960.51 km^{2}; 71,413.65 mi^{2}	9	2023	
2021 Russia wildfires	Russia	78,000–161,000 km^{2}; 30,000–62,000 mi^{2}	0	2021	
2019 Siberia wildfires	Russia	78,000 km^{2}; 30,000 mi^{2}	0	2019	
2024 Canadian wildfires	Canada	53,780 km^{2}; 33,417 mi^{2}	1	2024	
2014 Northwest Territories fires	Canada	30,000 km^{2}; 12,000 mi^{2}	0	2014	
2020 California wildfires	United States	17,797.3 km^{2}; 6,871.6 mi^{2}	33	2020	
2022 European and Mediterranean Fires	Albania; Algeria; Austria; Belgium; Bosnia and Herzegovina; Bulgaria; Croatia; Cyprus; Czechia; Denmark; Egypt; Finland; France; Germany; Greece; Ireland; Italy; Kosovo; Latvia; Lebanon; Montenegro; Morocco; Netherlands; North Macedonia; Norway; Poland; Portugal; Romania; Serbia; Slovakia; Slovenia; Spain; Sweden; Switzerland; Tunisia; Turkey; Ukraine; United Kingdom	16,243.81 km^{2}; 6,271.77 mi^{2}	41	2022	
2011 Texas wildfires	United States	16,234.81 km^{2}; 6,268.30 mi^{2}	10	2011	
2010 Bolivia forest fires	Bolivia	15,000 km^{2}; 5,800 mi^{2}	0	2010	
2006–2007 Australian bushfire season	Australia	13,000 km^{2}; 5,000 mi^{2}	5	2006-2007	
2017 British Columbia wildfires	Canada	11,480 km^{2}; 4,430 mi^{2}	0	2017	
2021 California wildfires	United States	10,397.94 km^{2}; 4,014.666 mi^{2}	3	2021	
2019 Amazon rainforest wildfires	Brazil; Bolivia; Colombia; Paraguay; Peru	9,064.95–9,307.76 km^{2}; 3,500.00–3,593.75 mi^{2}	2	2019	
2018 California wildfires	United States	7,992.89 km^{2}; 3,086.072 mi^{2}	100	2018	
2016 Fort McMurray wildfire	Canada	6,000 km^{2}; 2,300 mi^{2}	0	2016	
2017 Chile wildfires	Chile	5,000 km^{2}; 1,900 mi^{2}	11	2017	
2024 California wildfires	United States	4,361.34 km^{2}; 1,683.923 mi^{2}	1	2024	
2022–2023 Chilean wildfire season	Chile	4,316.57 km^{2}; 1,666.64 mi^{2}	0	2022-2023	
Smokehouse Creek Fire	United States	4,283.52 km^{2}; 1,653.878 mi^{2}	1	2024	
2009 Black Saturday bushfires	Australia	4,010.73 km^{2}; 1,548.55 mi^{2}	173	2009	
Morrill Fire	United States	2,603.59 km^{2}; 1,005.25 mi^{2}	1	2026	
2026 Argentina wildfires	Argentina	2,300 km^{2}; 890 mi^{2}	0	2026	
2025 California wildfires	United States	2,055.06 km^{2}; 793.464 mi^{2}	31	2025	
2015 Russian wildfires	Russia	1,070 km^{2}; 410 mi^{2}	33	2015	
2025 South Korea wildfires	South Korea	1,000 km^{2}; 386 mi^{2}	32	2025	
2018 Attica wildfires	Greece	more than 40 km^{2}; 15 mi^{2}	104	2018	
