= 2024 Peru wildfires =

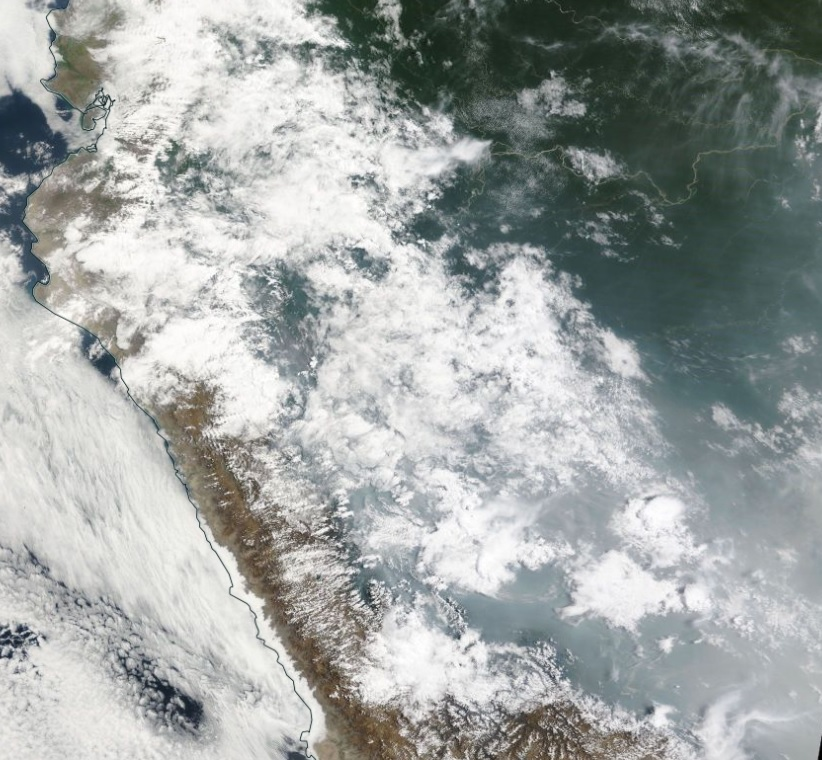
- Satellite image of Peru, most of the country's territory is covered by ash and smoke caused by fires.
- Date(s): July 2024 – October 2024
- Location: Peru

Statistics
- Total area: 3,000 hectares (7,400 acres)

Impacts
- Deaths: 16
- Non-fatal injuries: 134

Ignition
- Cause: 2023–2024 South American drought, strong winds, human activity

The 2024 Peru wildfires are a series of wildfires that began in July 2024 that have caused at least 16 deaths and the burning of about 3,000 hectares [ha] (7,400 acres) of forest, protected areas, and agricultural land in 22 of 24 Peruvian regions. The source of the fires was stated by Prime Minister of Peru Gustavo Adrianzén to primarily be human activity.

== Wildfires ==
Wildfires first began to appear in July 2024. The Peruvian civil defense head Juan Urcariegui reported that the worst wildfires were in the Amazon near the border of Ecuador. Peru's National Forestry and Wildlife Service, SERFOR, said that the primary reason for the fires' rapid spread was due to "extremely strong winds and prolonged droughts [that] dry out vegetation, turning it into highly flammable fuel" that was strongly exacerbated by anthropogenic climate change. Amazon Watch reported that increased temperatures resulted in drought conditions that prevented moisture and mist from staying in the region, causing stronger and more numerous wildfires that contribute to further greenhouse gas emissions in a feedback loop.

Data from Peru's Ministry of the Environment said that many wildfires were regularly caused between August and November by farmers' and land traffickers' burning of dry grasslands in order to increase the amount of land open for sale or agriculture.

== Impact ==
The largest wildfire outbreaks were detected in the departments of Amazonas, Ancash, Cuzco, Madre de Dios, San Martin, and Ucayali. By 15 September, 222 fire emergencies were reported, of which 80% had been contained by then.

Peru's civil defense reported that as a result of the widespread wildfires, at least 15 civilians were killed and 134 more were injured. Of these, 10 died in a two-week period from early-mid September, and 1,800 more civilians were impacted by the fires.

== Response ==
Prime Minister of Peru Gustavo Adrianzén reported that aerial firefighting efforts were strongly hindered by the presence of smoke from the wildfires, along with high cloud cover and strong winds. He also pleaded to farmers and the rest of Peru to stop burning grasslands, stating that "All the fires that are happening nationwide have been started by humans".

Many firefighters and firefighting volunteers were forced to use alternative tactics to put out and stop the spread of fires in hard-to-reach sections, such as by striking the ground with branches. Governor of Ucayali Manuel Gambini requested that military aircraft be used to aid firefighting efforts and protect cocoa and palm crops due to the rugged terrain making ground operations difficult.

== See also ==
- 2024 Argentina wildfires
- 2024 Brazil wildfires
- 2024 South American wildfires
- 2023–2024 South American drought
- 2019 Amazon rainforest wildfires
