= 2025 South American wildfires =

Continental wildfires in 2025

- Date: January 2025 – ongoing
- Location: Primarily Argentina, Chile, and Colombia

Statistics
- Total fires: 18,491 hotspots
- Total area: 6,029,036 hectares (14.89807 million acres) per GWIS

Impacts
- Deaths: 2

Ignition
- Cause: 2023–2024 South American drought; Climate change

A series of wildfires significantly impacted several South American countries, including Argentina, Chile, and Venezuela, in 2025. Based on Global Wildfire Information System satellite imaging, about 18,491 wildfire hotspots damaged or destroyed 6,029,035 hectares (14,898,070 acres).

== Wildfires ==
=== Argentina ===
Argentina's Patagonia region suffered several wildfires primarily concentrated in several national parks and surrounding territories. Beginning in December 2024, these conflagrations intensified throughout January and February 2025, creating a widespread emergency across multiple provinces. The most significantly affected areas include Lanín National Park, Nahuel Huapi National Park, El Bolsón, and various locations throughout Neuquén, Río Negro, and Chubut provinces. Additional fires emerged in mid-February in the Trevelin area, followed by outbreaks in Los Alerces National Park.

A fire detected on February 18 near Piedra Holdich on Route 34 in Trevelin remained active through late February, affecting approximately 1,715 hectares. This blaze approached the city of Esquel, moving in the direction of Boquete Nahuelpan. In Los Alerces National Park, two deliberately set fires merged to create a single front by February 20, prompting park authorities to close access to hiking trails as a safety measure.

The Magdalena Valley within Lanín National Park experienced the most extensive damage, with satellite data from February 23, 2025 confirming 23,844 hectares (58,920 acres) affected. The fire spread at varying rates across different sectors, with the eastern front advancing at approximately 10 meters per hour, while western sections in Cañadón Grande and Valle Las Yeguadas progressed at twenty-eight and eleven meters per hour respectively. Areas containing dense native forest were the most impacted by fire spread, in addition to elevated temperatures.

The fires in El Bolsón affected 3,825.45 hectares (9,452.9 acres) before being contained in late February. The fires in Nahuel Huapi National Park, particularly in the El Manso sector south of Bariloche, affected an estimated 12,072 hectares (29,830 acres). The most active fire zones were identified near Cascada los Alerces and Los Manzanos, areas adjacent to the Chilean border. Additional fires emerged on February 22–23 in the Cerro Meta area of Bariloche. Officials described this fire as "out of control" as it advanced through the canyon dividing Cerro Ventana from Cerro Meta. The fires necessitated evacuations across multiple communities, with El Bolsón alone reporting approximately 1,000 evacuees. Property damage was extensive, with over 300 homes affected throughout the region. Near San Martín de los Andes a wildfire encroaching on urban territory resulted in one resident losing their entire home, despite prompt intervention by authorities.

A fire in Corrientes Province consumed an area the size of Vancouver Island, resulting in the death of a 30-year-old teacher following burn injuries sustained while trying to prevent her father's field from burning.

==== Response ====
More than 1,000 volunteer firefighters worked continuously in Río Negro, Chubut, and Neuquén to put out fires in February 2025. Firefighting efforts featured an unprecedented deployment of aerial resources, with up to sixteen aircraft operating simultaneously by February 19, described by officials as "historic" in scale.

Weather conditions significantly impacted firefighting operations, with a cold front bringing strong winds on February 23 that forced the withdrawal of both ground crews and aircraft. The fires spread into Chilean territory, prompting coordination between the Chilean National Forestry Corporation (CONAF) and Argentine counterparts. Chilean authorities deployed aerial resources to combat fires near the international boundary, particularly in the Los Manzanos area.

=== Chile ===
In February 2025, a series of severe wildfires erupted in La Araucanía in southern Chile, resulting in at least one confirmed fatality: an 84-year-old woman who had initially evacuated but subsequently returned to her home. By early February, the fires had consumed approximately 33,406 hectares (82,550 acres) of land across Chile.

==== Response ====
Chilean authorities issued two evacuation alerts for La Araucanía on February 9, 2025, directing inhabitants in high-risk zones to abandon their residences and relocate to designated safe areas. To maintain public safety in the affected territories, Chilean President Gabriel Boric instituted a regional curfew on 8 February. The government declined to release specific statistics regarding evacuation numbers or property damage when questioned by media organizations. President Boric suggested that some fires may have been deliberately set, calling for thorough investigations into potential arson. Law enforcement officials apprehended five individuals in connection with suspected fire-setting activities during the weekend of 8-9 February.

Multiple red alerts were declared across the region as the situation intensified, mobilizing emergency response teams to combat the rapidly spreading fires.

=== Colombia ===
A mid-January wildfire in the Eastern Ranges of the Colombian Andes burned through 59.5 hectares (147 acres) of the Chingaza National Natural Park.

== See also ==
- 2024 South American wildfires
- 2023–2024 South American drought
- 2019 Amazon rainforest wildfires
