= 2024 Argentina wildfires =

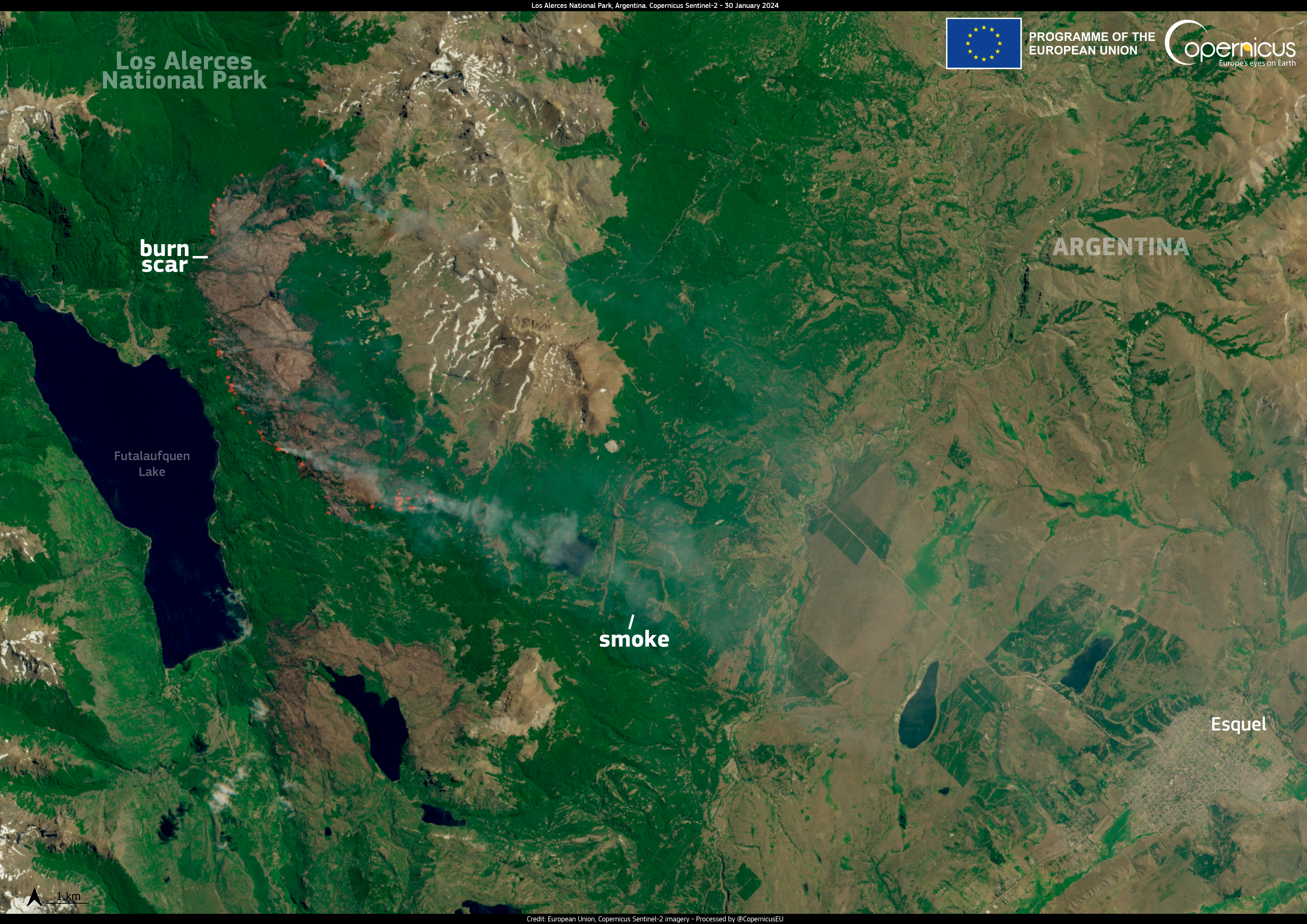
- Copernicus Programme February 2024 satellite imaging of wildfires in Argentina's Los Alerces National Park.
- Date: February 2024 – ongoing
- Location: Córdoba and Patagonia, Argentina

Statistics
- Total fires: 11,560 per GWIS
- Total area: 3,933,523 hectares (9,719,950 acres) per GWIS

Impacts
- Evacuated: 54+
- Structures destroyed: 20+

Ignition
- Cause: 2023–2024 South American drought, anthropogenic climate change, human activity

The 2024 Argentina wildfires refer to significant outbreaks of wildfires primarily across Northern and Central Argentina that devastated large stretches of forests and farming land. The intensity and spread of the wildfires markedly increased in August and September 2024 due to drought conditions and elevated temperatures.

== Wildfires ==
The typical wildfire season was significantly exacerbated in 2024 by ongoing drought conditions and elevated temperatures caused primarily by anthropogenic climate change. These climate conditions were widely present across several other South American nations such as Brazil and Peru, leading to both of them and other nations also suffering from devastating wildfire seasons in 2024.

Wildfires first began in Argentina in February 2024 in the Patagonia alongside deadly wildfires in Chile, where a wildfire burnt 6,000 hectares (15,000 acres) of the Los Alerces National Park. Córdoba Environmental Forum president Federico Kopta noted that most of the wildfires were the result of human activity, including one outbreak that was started by an individual who was emptying a heating salamander. Volunteer firefighter Santiago Tarduchy also noted that Argentine laws, in some cases, allow a designated forest or conservation area that is struck by a wildfire to be recategorized to allow construction on its territory, which could lead to instances of arson for political reasons. An open letter by Amnesty International pointed to Argentine laws that cause the nation to economically rely significantly on fossil fuels and deforestation with relatively little environmental regulation, specifically pointing to the Javier Milei government's Largescale Investments Law (RIGI) and 65% cuts to environmental funds for the 2024 budget.

== Impact ==
Argentine authorities reported that hundreds of wildfires had burnt at least 91,540 hectares (226,200 acres) of land in total. By 25 September, the Copernicus Programme found that 11,560 fires had burnt 3,933,523 hectares (9,719,950 acres) of land in 2024 The wildfires burnt at least 40,000 hectares (99,000 acres) of land in Córdoba, resulting in significant agricultural losses including widespread killing of cattle and the destruction of several houses and fields. Photographs taken in Capilla del Monte showed cattle that were "completely burned and blackened", while residents claimed that the arriving wildfires sounded like a "monster", a "growl", or a "turbine". By 23 September, over 20 homes were destroyed and 54 people required evacuation in the Punilla Valley region.

As a result of a massive cloud of smoke produced by wildfires in Argentina as well as in nearby nations such as Bolivia, Paraguay, and Brazil, significant decreases in air quality were recorded across cities in northern Argentina during September.

== Response ==
President of Argentina Javier Milei intended to travel to the devastated regions on 25 September. Several firefighting units, planes, and helicopters were deployed in order to prevent the wildfires from spreading into nearby urban and residential areas. Residents of Capilla del Monte and Los Cocos were evacuated as the wildfires began to reach homes. Three people were arrested for intentionally starting fires.

== See also ==
- 2024 Brazil wildfires
- 2024 Chile wildfires
- 2024 South American wildfires
- 2023–2024 South American drought
- 2026 Argentina wildfires
