= El Manso =

Coordinates: 41°34′12″S 71°45′36″W

- Municipality and village
- Interactive map of El Manso
- Country: Argentina
- Province: Río Negro Province
- Time zone: UTC−3 (ART)

El Manso is a village and municipality in Río Negro Province in Valle El Manso in Argentina. Located in the vicinity of Chile El Manso was settled in the late 19th century by Chileans of mestizo and Mapuche stock as well by European immigrants. Chiloé Archipelago in particular was the place of origin of most Chilean settlers. Early settlers engaged in subsistence farming.

== Climate ==
Climate data for El Manso, Río Negro (1980–1995, 2002–2007)
Month	Jan	Feb	Mar	Apr	May	Jun	Jul	Aug	Sep	Oct	Nov	Dec	Year
Record high °C (°F)	35.5 (95.9)	35.0 (95.0)	35.0 (95.0)	27.5 (81.5)	22.0 (71.6)	16.0 (60.8)	19.5 (67.1)	20.0 (68.0)	24.0 (75.2)	28.5 (83.3)	32.0 (89.6)	33.0 (91.4)	35.5 (95.9)
Mean daily maximum °C (°F)	23.8 (74.8)	24.3 (75.7)	21.9 (71.4)	15.4 (59.7)	10.7 (51.3)	9.1 (48.4)	9.6 (49.3)	12.6 (54.7)	15.6 (60.1)	18.4 (65.1)	20.3 (68.5)	21.7 (71.1)	17.0 (62.6)
Daily mean °C (°F)	15.2 (59.4)	14.9 (58.8)	12.5 (54.5)	8.7 (47.7)	5.4 (41.7)	4.4 (39.9)	3.8 (38.8)	5.5 (41.9)	7.1 (44.8)	9.5 (49.1)	11.0 (51.8)	13.2 (55.8)	9.3 (48.7)
Mean daily minimum °C (°F)	6.4 (43.5)	5.5 (41.9)	3.2 (37.8)	1.7 (35.1)	0.1 (32.2)	−0.3 (31.5)	−2 (28)	−1.6 (29.1)	−1.4 (29.5)	0.6 (33.1)	1.7 (35.1)	4.5 (40.1)	1.5 (34.7)
Record low °C (°F)	−2.5 (27.5)	−3.0 (26.6)	−8.0 (17.6)	−6.5 (20.3)	−8.0 (17.6)	−8.5 (16.7)	−10.0 (14.0)	−9.0 (15.8)	−7.5 (18.5)	−6.5 (20.3)	−6.5 (20.3)	−3.0 (26.6)	−10.0 (14.0)
Average precipitation mm (inches)	30 (1.2)	38 (1.5)	56 (2.2)	107 (4.2)	234 (9.2)	202 (8.0)	157 (6.2)	135 (5.3)	108 (4.3)	69 (2.7)	43 (1.7)	76 (3.0)	1,255 (49.4)
Average relative humidity (%)	72	71	72	79	82	86	83	78	74	75	75	74	77
Mean monthly sunshine hours	283.65	248.88	220.41	137.10	96.10	72.60	83.70	117.49	185.40	213.28	256.20	283.65	2,198.46
Percentage possible sunshine	62	65	58	42	32	26	28	36	52	52	59	61	48
Source: Instituto Nacional de Tecnología Agropecuaria
