= 2003 Siberian taiga wildfires =

Wildfire season in Siberia

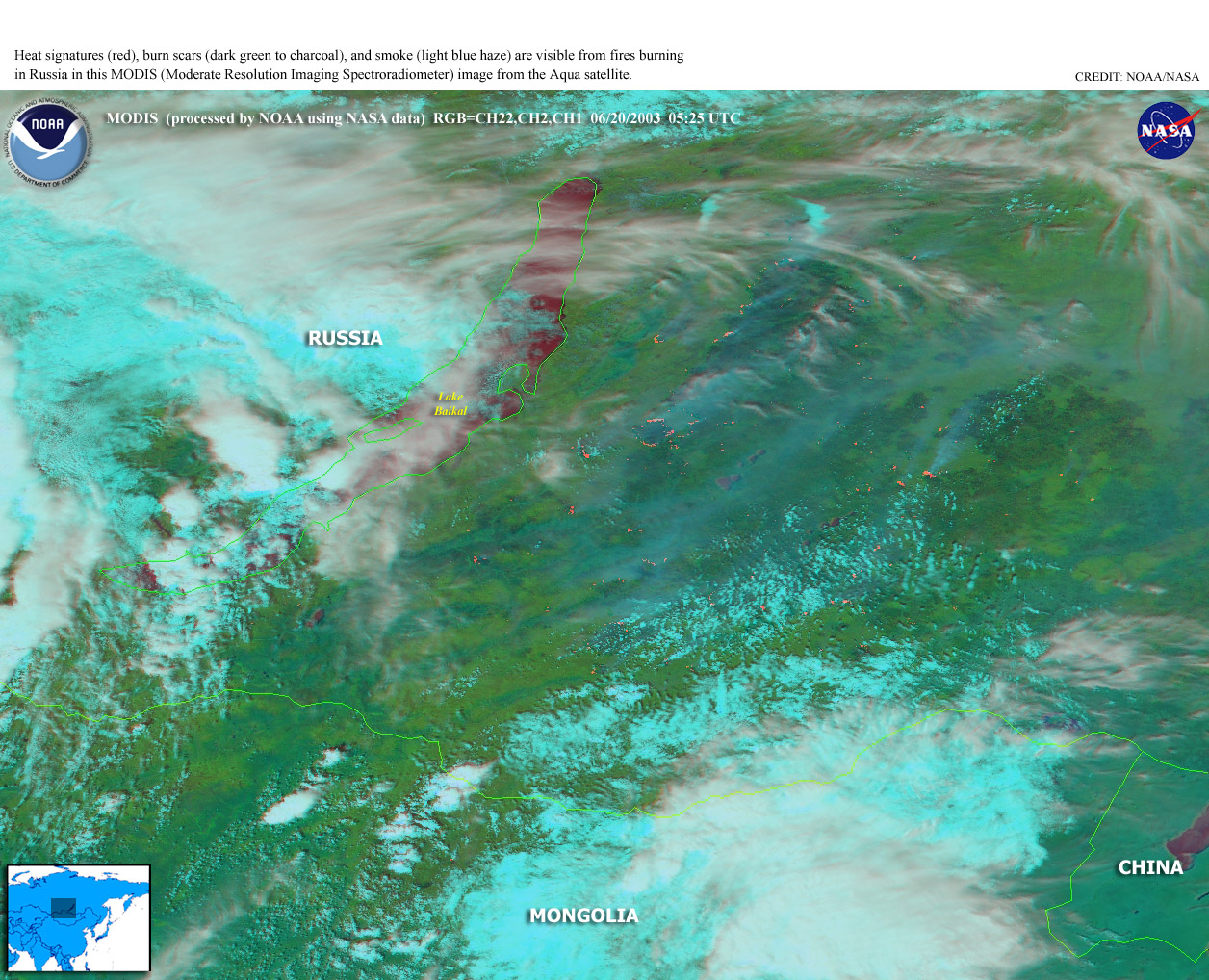
- Fires as visible from MODIS, 20 June

Statistics
- Total fires: 27,000
- Total area: 200,000 km^{2} (77,000 sq mi)

Impacts
- Deaths: 0
- Cost: 14 billion rubles

The 2003 Siberian taiga wildfires (Russian: Лесные пожары в сибирской тайге 2003 года) were a series of wildfires located in eastern Russia, northeast China and northern Mongolia, burning more than 200,000 km^{2} (77,000 sq mi). Smoke from the fire spread across East Asia. The fire released 400–640 teragrams of carbon dioxide into the air. After 20 years, about 70% of the burnt area had recovered.

== Background ==
Siberia's forests are one of the largest in the world, containing 15% of the world's forested area. The region is also susceptible to wildfire. More than half of all land burned by wildfires is located in Siberia. In 2003, the annual air temperature in Siberia was elevated by 2°C, which contributed to fire–prone conditions. Dry conditions and human development also contributed to the high risk of fires.

The main agency responsible for fighting blazes in Russian Siberia is the Avialesookhrana, which employed around 4,000 firefighters. The main fire suppression method in Siberia is for firefighters, known as smokejumpers, to parachute out of planes. Smokejumpers target new fires, hoping to extinguish them as quickly as possible. The fall of the Soviet Union lead to cuts for the Avialesookhrana. The amount of firefighters declined by 5,000, and the total budget of the Avialesookhrana was a severely limited $32 million. The agency was also lacking equipment, with specialised firefighting aircraft leased out to other countries at the time of the fire. As a result of personnel and equipment shortages, the ability of the Avialesookhrana to combat blazes fell 40% from the early 1990s to 2004. The secondary firefighting agency in Russia was the leskhozes, which were forest management units. They employed 180,000 people, but were ineffective due to a constrained budget and low training and morale among employees.

== Progression ==
Fires were first reported near the Amur River in March, and they continued into April. In May, thousands of fires were also observed in the Lake Baikal area. Smoke from these fires hovered over China, North Korea and Japan, and was also seen as far as the midwestern United States. Carbon dioxide and ozone levels were elevated in northwestern North America. The fires worsened in July, spreading to far-eastern Russia. By this time, 7,000 firefighters were deployed by Russia to combat the blazes, which had burned at least 20,000 km^{2} (7,700 sq mi). By August, 300 firefighters in Sakhalin had been fighting blazes nonstop for a month, with a burnt area of 20,000 ha (49,000 acres). Firefighting efforts were hampered by a lack of helicopters and bulldozers. In the region near the Amur River, bears and tigers had fled the fires and went to residential areas, where they ate from garbage heaps.

== Effect ==
27,000 fires burned 200,000 km^{2} (22.5 million acres) from 14 March to 8 August. About 70% of the land burned was forest and 10% was grassland. No casualties were reported. The blazes cost 14 billion rubles in losses for forestry. The estimated carbon dioxide emissions totalled 400–640 teragrams, which had a large impact on the total carbon emissions in 2003. By 2023, 73.3% of burnt land had recovered, with the average time of recovery being 12.2 years.
