= 2026 Argentina wildfires =

- Part of 2026 wildfire season
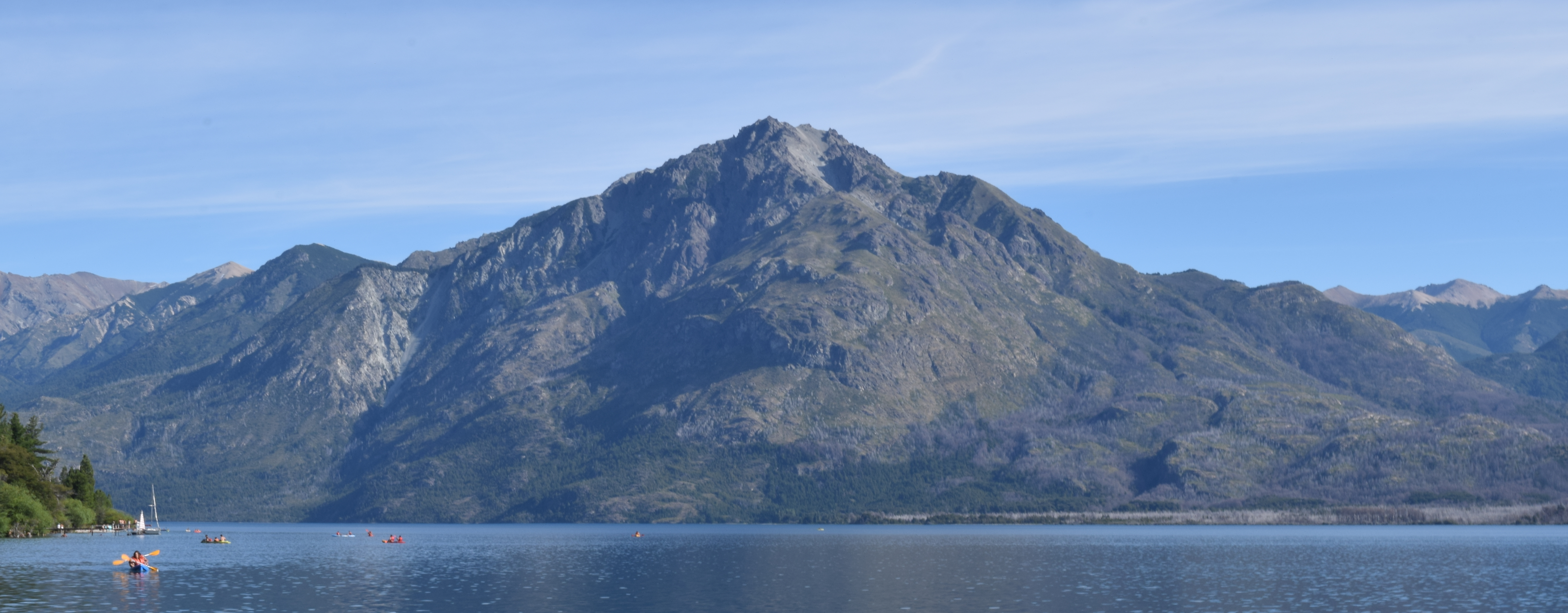
- Puerto Patriada (Chubut), one of the epicenters of the fires.
- Date: January 2026 – present
- Location: Chubut Province; La Pampa Province; Río Negro Province; Santa Cruz Province

Impacts
- Deaths: 1
- Injuries: 5000+
- Structures destroyed: 325+

Ignition
- Cause: Under investigation, allegedly intentional, aggravated by climate change, drought, high temperatures, winds, lack of prevention and resources.

In 2026, several wildfires broke out in Argentina, specifically in the provinces of Chubut, La Pampa, Río Negro and Santa Cruz. The most significant fires began on 5 January 2026, in Puerto Patriada, Cushamen Department, Chubut Province. The blaze consumed 1,800 hectares in just 48 hours, a figure that increased to 12,000 hectares by 11 January 2026, and by 14 January 2026, to over 20,000 hectares. The fires primarily affected vegetation, burning scrubland, planted forests, and native forests.

By 27 January 2026, fire had consumed more than 230,000 hectares across the provinces of Chubut, La Pampa, Río Negro, Neuquén, and Santa Cruz. The governors of these provinces requested that the Argentine National Congress approve a Fire Emergency Law.

== Chubut Province ==
Around the afternoon of 5 January 2026, a fire started in Puerto Patriada, in the town of El Hoyo in Chubut Province. With the warm weather, it quickly spread through the wooded area throughout the night. The fire began to spread until it surrounded the entire Andean region of Parallel 42. By the next day, more than 3,000 residents had to be evacuated

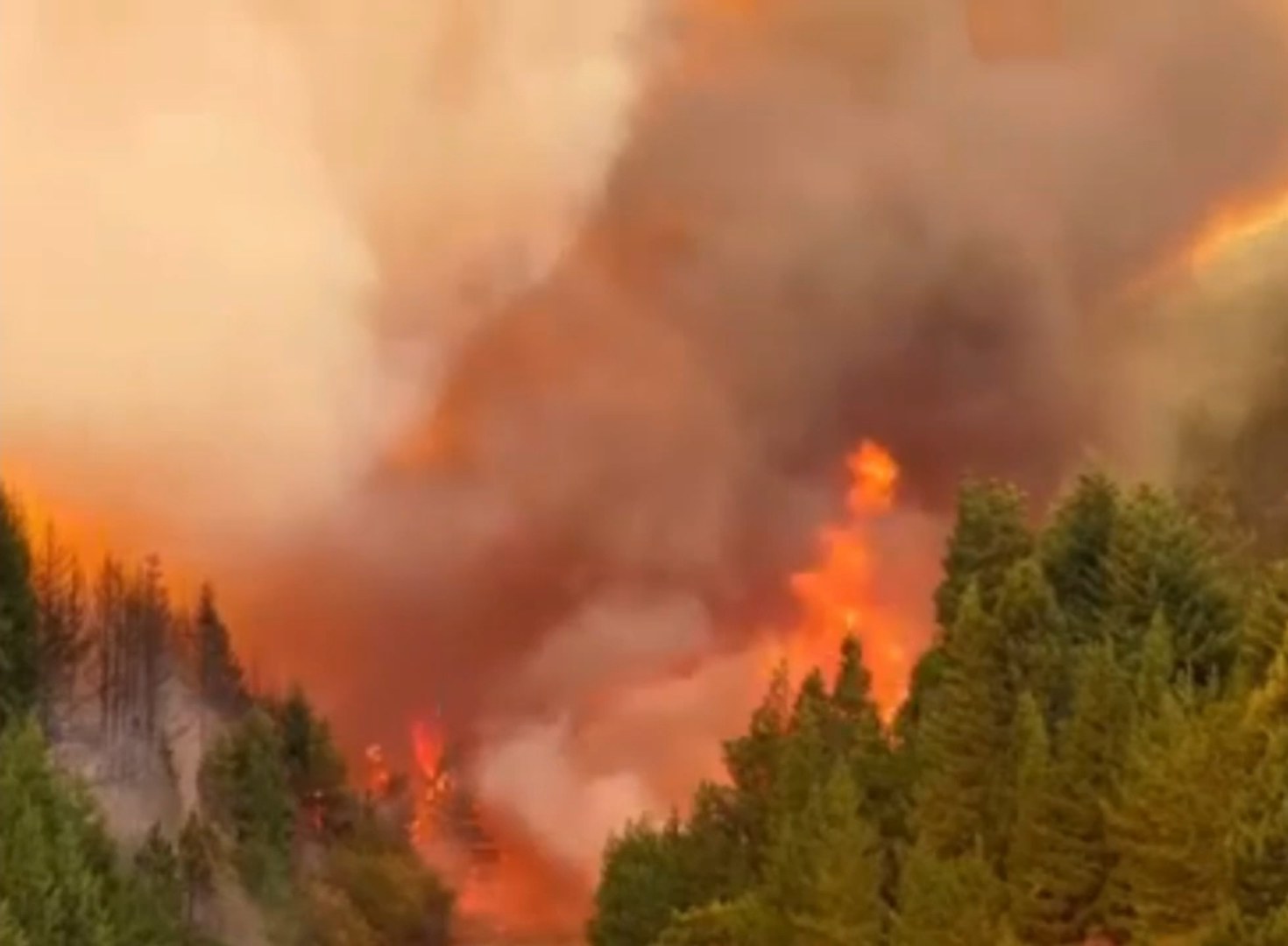
Argentine Patagonia forest on fire, 11 January 2026.

On 7 January, with more than 2,000 hectares burned, the country's largest water bomber was sent to fight the fire. Furthermore, the government of Chubut province stated that the fire was intentionally set and offered more than 50 million Argentine pesos for information leading to the arrest of those responsible.

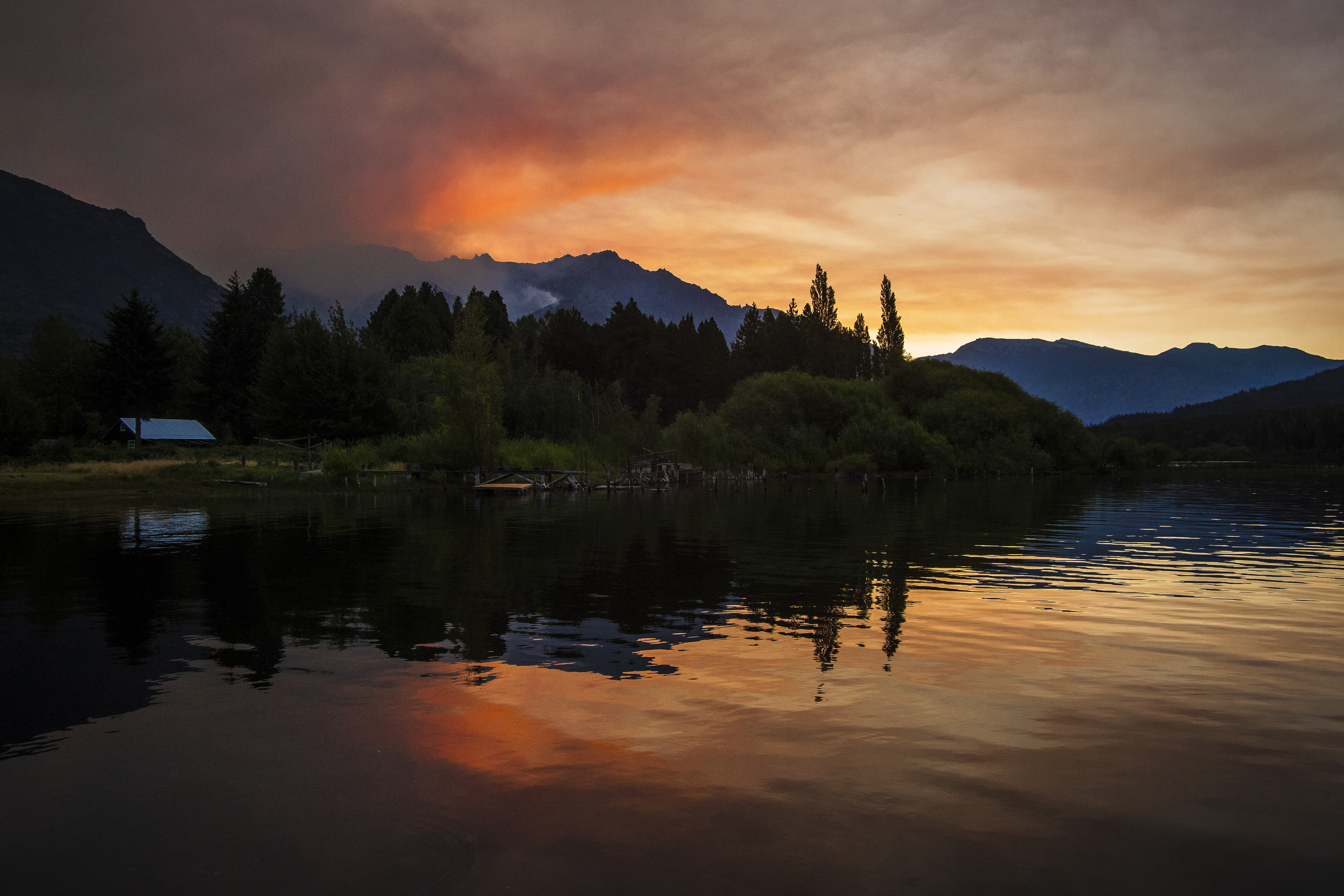
Image of Cerro Epuyén on fire, at sunset on 19 January 2026.

On 9 January, as the fire continued unabated and spread, authorities in Chubut declared it the worst natural disaster in 20 years. The National Route 40, which had been closed, was reopened for traffic with extreme caution between the Epuyén pass and El Hoyo. It was also reported that more than 200 firefighters were battling the blaze and another 90, from Córdoba, were en route.

On 12 January, it was confirmed that 22 of the 32 fires had been brought under control; however, the following day, many fires reignited, causing renewed concern and occupation of the area. The reignited fires occurred in Epuyén, and arson was again suspected. The Diario Río Negro, reported that same day that in Parque nacional Los Glaciares, more than 700 hectares had been consumed by the fires, and active fires continued.

=== Natural hazards ===
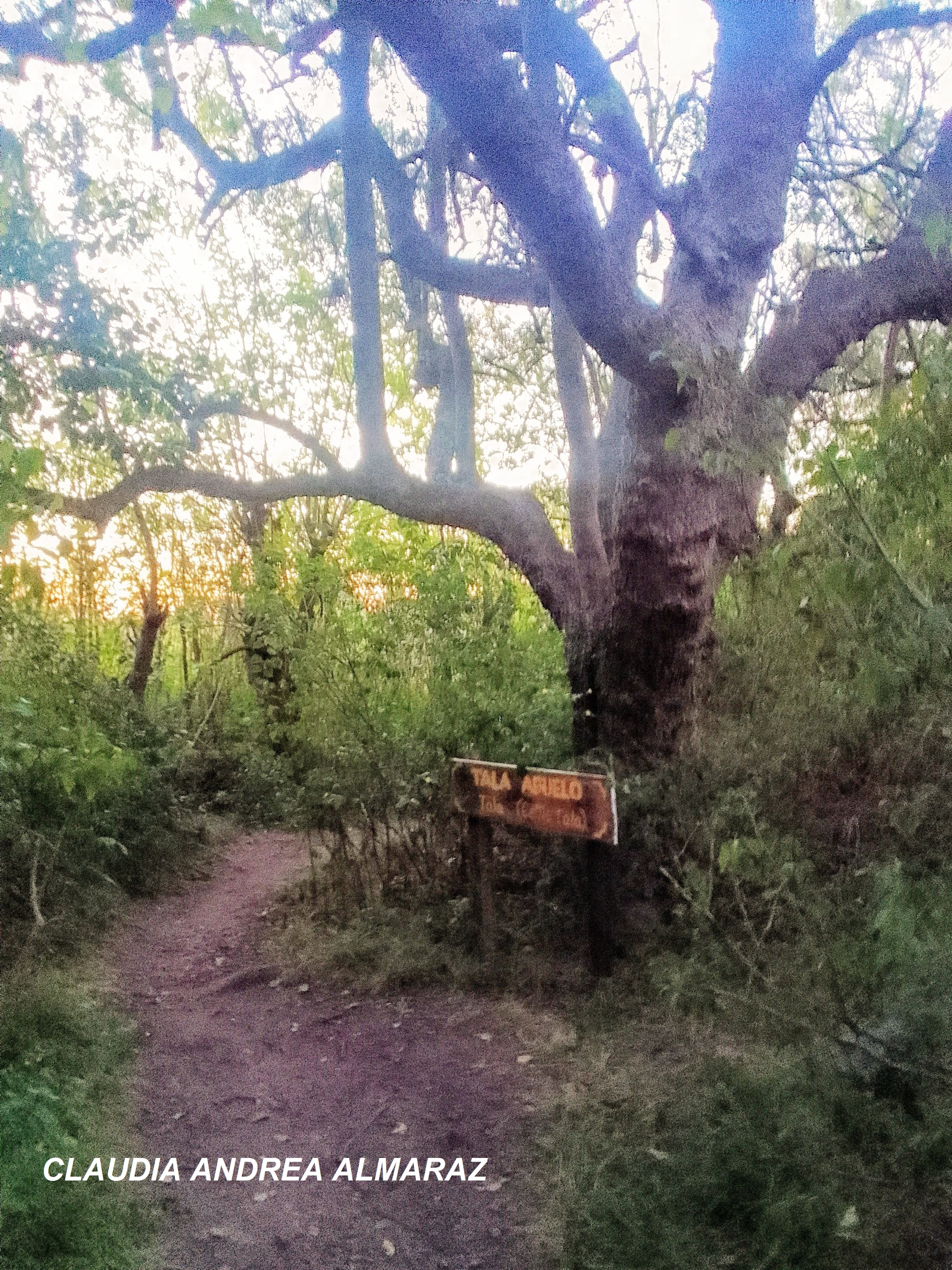
"El Abuelo" tree

In addition to the burning of thousands of hectares, the fire got ever closer to "El Abuelo" (The Grandfather), an ancient alerce tree that is over 2,600 years old, making it the oldest in Argentina and the third oldest in the world. It is located on the northern arm of Lake Menéndez and was constantly at risk due to the proximity of the fire.

== La Pampa Province ==
On 12 January 2026, a series of storms with intense electrical activity caused multiple rural fires in the province of La Pampa. One of the most affected areas was the Laguna de Utracán Nature Reserve, located in the department of the same name, near the city of General Acha.

== Santa Cruz Province ==
In the province of Santa Cruz, the provincial government reported that the forest fire in the Cerro Huemul area, within Los Glaciares National Park, was declared contained after several days of coordinated work on the ground. The fire was located in the Túnel River area and affected an estimated 700 hectares, impacting grasslands, shrublands, and areas of native forest. The operation involved provincial brigades, in coordination with National Parks and other agencies.

== Cause ==
A resident of Laguna Torre in Los Glaciares National Park confronted two tourists, recording them and demanding they leave the inaccessible and restricted area. The cause of the fire is still under investigation.

The Argentine government also scapegoated responsibility onto Mapuche communities. In parallel, some politicians and media commentators invoked the longstanding antisemitic conspiracy theory known as the Andinia Plan by alleging that Israeli tourists and the Israeli government were involved.

== Reactions ==
- Federal Emergency Management Agency (AFE): coordinates the firefighting operation between national agencies and the provinces of Chubut, Río Negro, and Santa Cruz.
- National Fire Management Service (SNMF): participates with two amphibious Air Tractor AT-802s and two land-based AT-802s, a Bell 412 helicopter and a Bell 407 helicopter.
- Ministry of Defense: Since 7 January 2026, the Argentine Army has been providing support with aviation and logistics units. The Army Aviation deployed a Bell UH-1H helicopter and two Bell 407s to Esquel to fight the fire in Los Alerces National Park (Chubut) and a UH-1H to El Chaltén to do the same in Los Glaciares National Park (Santa Cruz). Units based in Esquel provide daily rations to the firefighters in Chubut.
- Cordoba Province: A contingent of 63 firefighters from various fire stations in the province arrived in Chubut. The province also sent an Air Tractor AT-802 aircraft and an Airbus Helicopters AS350 B3 helicopter.
- Santa Fe Province: a team of 30 certified forest firefighters, made up of volunteer firefighters, sapper firefighters and Civil Protection personnel; ten trucks equipped with 500 combat systems, digging tools, chainsaws, water pumps and Mark 3 portable pumps, used for extracting water from rivers and natural watercourses.
- Rio Negro Province: On 18 January 2026, the government of the province of Río Negro presented a Sikorsky S-61N helicopter acquired to reinforce the Provincial Forest Fire Fighting Service (SPLIF).
- Santiago del Estero Province: The government of the province of Santiago del Estero sent its Boeing 737 Fireliner water bomber (LV-KJS) (the largest in Latin America) to Chubut to fight the fires in Puerto Patriada.

=== International ===
- Chile: The Chilean government sent an Air Tractor AT-802 aircraft and an Airbus Helicopters AS350 B3 helicopter from the National Forest Corporation (CONAF), and the Palena Fire Department sent a contingent of 5 personnel, 1 fire engine, and 1 pickup truck.

== Political reactions ==
Critics have blamed the severity of the wildfires to the austerity of Javier Milei.

=== Request for a Fire Emergency Law ===
On 27 January 2026, in the context of the fires in Patagonia, the governors of the provinces of Río Negro, Chubut, La Pampa, Neuquén and Santa Cruz requested that the Argentine National Congress urgently address a Fire Emergency Law during the extraordinary session. The proposal was formulated after a virtual meeting in which the authorities agreed on the seriousness of the situation and pointed out the need for extraordinary tools and resources for fighting the fires, assisting the affected communities, and recovering the damaged areas. During the meeting, the governors agreed on "the seriousness of the situation in the Patagonian region" as a result of the fires, reporting that more than 168,000 hectares had burned in La Pampa, 45,000 in Chubut, 6,000 in Neuquén, in addition to 10,000 in Río Negro and 700 in Santa Cruz, bringing the regional total to almost 230,000 hectares affected. Various leaders and political groups publicly expressed their support for Congress to consider the law proposed by the governors.

== See also ==
- Forest fires in Argentina

== See also ==
- 2024 Argentina wildfires
