= 2023–2024 South American drought =

Natural disaster in South America

European Commission map of drought conditions across South America from February 2023 to January 2024.

The 2023–2024 South American drought refers to an ongoing drought across several states of Brazil in addition to Peru, Bolivia, and Colombia, which has led to several significant impacts including record low water levels, significant water shortages, sweeping crop failures, and widespread wildfires. The drought has primarily impacted the Amazon rainforest and basin, while also impacting the Pantanal wetlands causing record levels of wildfires in the latter.

== Causes ==
Lighter seasonal rainfall in the Amazon was compounded by the "warming of northern tropical Atlantic Ocean waters" and elevated water temperatures in the Equatorial Pacific due to the El Niño–Southern Oscillation climate phenomenon. In addition, increased temperatures due to anthropogenic global warming from increased atmospheric CO_{2} and methane resulted in more severe climate phenomena, with September 2023 setting a global temperature record at the time.

In January 2024, the World Weather Attribution climate scientist initiative determined that the primary driver of the 2023 drought conditions was anthropogenic climate change as opposed to El Niño. The resulting increase in temperatures combined with a marked decrease in rainfall caused widespread evaporation of moisture from soil and plants, which in turn significantly exacerbated drought conditions and resulting wildfires. In the central regions of Brazil, temperatures reached 1 °C above the 1.5 °C average global increase, resulting in large amounts of rain evaporating before it could move deeper into the soil.

== History ==
=== 2023 ===
Water shortages and persistent droughts were widespread in Brazil, Bolivia, Colombia, and inland Peru, causing significant agricultural hardships and crop failures, worsening food insecurity, and financial instability. The World Food Programme determined that up to ~1.3 million people suffered from severe drought conditions in 2023.

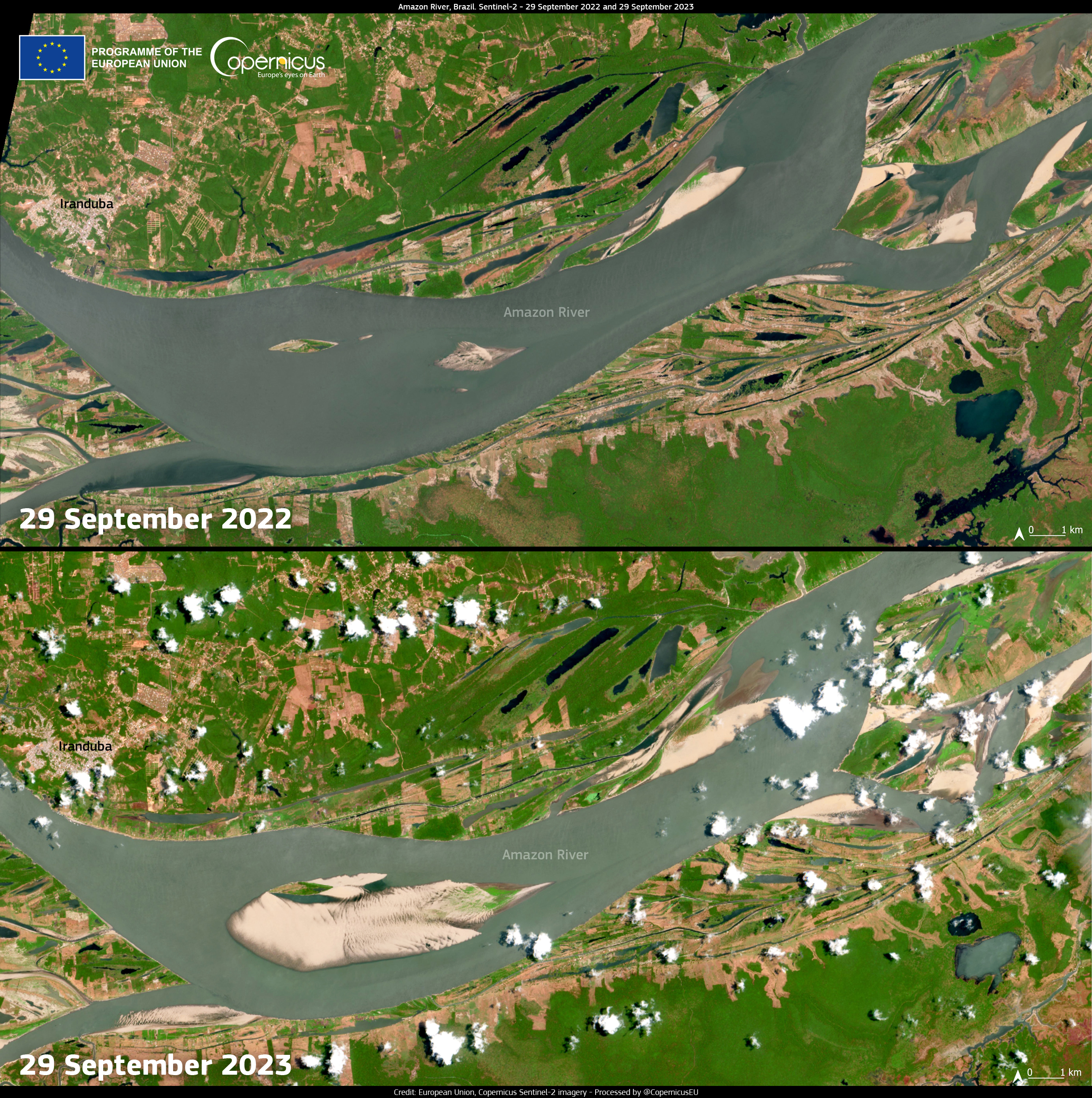
Copernicus Programme satellite imaging showing decreased water levels in the Amazon River, Brazil, due to severe drought

==== Brazil ====
From July to September 2023, Brazil's National Center for Monitoring and Alerts for Natural Disasters indicated that records for the lowest rainfall in over 40 years were reached in eight Brazilian states. The Rio Negro basin reached close to its lowest water levels on record. In the state of Amazonas, 42 of 62 of its municipalities declared drought emergencies, and roughly 250,000 people were impacted by drought conditions.

Several rural Amazonian communities that depended on transport along Amazonian rivers for imports and trade ended up becoming stranded and unable to access clean water, food, or fuel. In addition, children who traveled to school by boat had to stop their education for months due to their inability to travel on shallow or emptied rivers.

Water temperatures In Tefé Lake reached a peak of to 39.1 °C (102.4 °F), leading to the death of about 150 tucuxi and pink river dolphins, both of which are endangered species. Long queues of rural residents formed on the banks of the Amazon River and its tributaries to gather humanitarian aid due to drought conditions killing crops and fish.

==== Bolivia ====
Severe drought and wildfires strongly impacted the rural communities of Bolivia. In November 2023, Bolivia announced a state of emergency in fifty-one municipalities due to environmental damage and resulting economic and material losses, with its Ministry of Civil Defense estimating that more than 4,900 families were impacted by drought-exacerbated wildfires.

==== Colombia ====
From November 2023 to January 2024, Colombia faced six droughts, 323 wildfires, water scarcity in sixty-nine municipalities, and roughly 45,000 people who were directly affected by adverse environmental conditions. Water shortages due to drought resulted in crop failures and lowered dairy production. Shallow rivers disrupted fishing communities and Colombia's agriculture-based supply chains due to inhibited river transport. An Action Against Hunger survey found that among almost 2,000 households, 63.4% ofthem suffered from income losses due to El Niño-influenced climate impacts which included drought and water scarcity, mainly in rural areas dependent on agriculture. The United Nations Office for the Coordination of Humanitarian Affairs reported that an estimated 9.3 million people in Colombia were exposed to "increased temperature, precipitation variability, and food and water shortages" and their associated risks and consequences.

==== Peru ====
Lambayeque, Piura, Tumbes, and several Indigenous territories such as Condorcanqui Province in Peru suffered from drinking water shortages, food insecurity, increased child malnutrition, and increased income losses due to severe weather changes. In addition, several rural farming families had their livelihoods severely impacted, with about 38,000 hectares (94,000 acres) of Peruvian agricultural crops being impacted by conditions related to El Niño.

=== 2024 ===
In May 2024, the Brazilian savannah of the Cerrado suffered from its worst drought in over 700 years based on geological research of stalagmites in the open entrance Onça Cave.

In June 2024, the state of Amazonas declared water shortage emergencies for twenty of the 62 municipalities within it. Many rivers in the region became too shallow to navigate through by boat, causing local trade interruptions and vastly increased prices on Brazilian food staples in the region. The emergency was declared two months earlier than the first Brazilian drought-related emergencies declared in 2023.

In late July, the Brazilian water agency declared water shortages for the Madeira and Purus water basins that together spread across an area nearly as large as Mexico. The state of Acre also declared a water shortage emergency for Rio Branco, requiring truck shipments of water to arrive in the city to fill the population's needs. The drought led to widespread crop failures in the state. On 20 July, the Madeira River's water level fell under three meters (10 feet) in the area near Porto Velho.

In August 2024, the Amazon had several of its rivers reach critically low water levels in the first weeks of its dry season, with several rivers in the southwest Amazon reaching their lowest point on record for their respective times of the year. The Amazon Cooperation Treaty Organization released a technical statement reporting that the Amazon basin had been significantly impacted by drought conditions, and anticipated that it would cause significant issues in its member states: "Bolivia, Brazil, Colombia, Ecuador, Guyana, Peru, Suriname and Venezuela."

== Effect on hydropower generation ==
In 2023, the Santo Antonio hydroelectric plant, Brazil's fourth largest plant of this kind, was forced to stop operating for the first time since its beginning of operations in 2012 due to drastically lowered water levels in the Madeira River.

In 2024, significant drought causing low water levels in the Madeira River resulted in significant decreases in the power output of two of "Brazil's largest hydroelectric plants". The lowered output forced the Electric Sector Monitoring Committee to recommend lowering dependence on the hydroelectric plants and to instead import power from Uruguay and Argentina for northern regions of Brazil, use thermal sources of energy, and to lower energy consumption during peak hours. The Brazilian National Water Agency reported that ineffective power generation due to low water levels would continue until at least 30 November 2024.

== Environmental impact ==
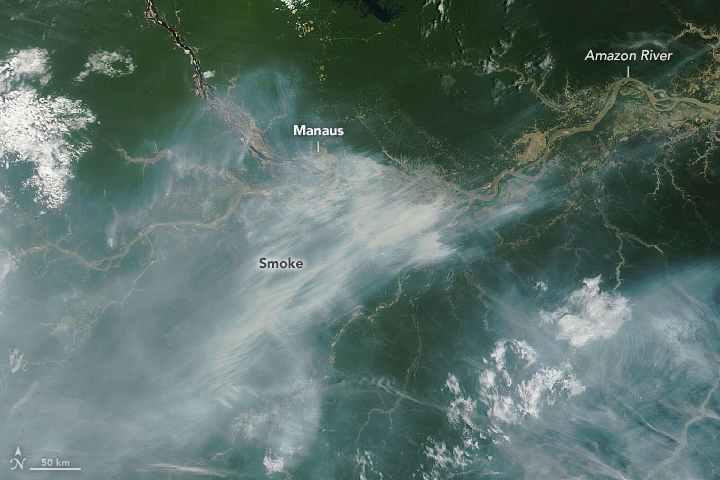
Smoke streaming from fires burning near Manaus, capital city of Brazil’s Amazonas state, on October 11, 2023

In 2023, low Amazon river levels resulted in the deaths of thousands of fish and large groups of river dolphins in Brazil, with their bodies being washed onto shore in several municipalities. Hydrologists hypothesized that their deaths were caused by organ failure due to excessive heat or the proliferation of harmful bacteria in rivers due to increased temperatures.

== Wildfires ==
In September 2023 alone, almost 7,000 wildfires were reported in Amazonas state, representing the second highest total for September since satellite records began in 1998. The massive plumes of smoke generated by the wildfires impacted over two million residents of Manaus, causing respiratory difficulties.

== See also ==
- 2025 South American wildfires
- 2024 South American wildfires
- 2024 Argentina wildfires
- 2024 Brazil wildfires
- 2024 Peru wildfires
- 2022–2023 Uruguay drought
- 2014–2017 Brazilian drought
- 2023–2024 El Niño event
