= Dry grassland =

Grassland on dry soil

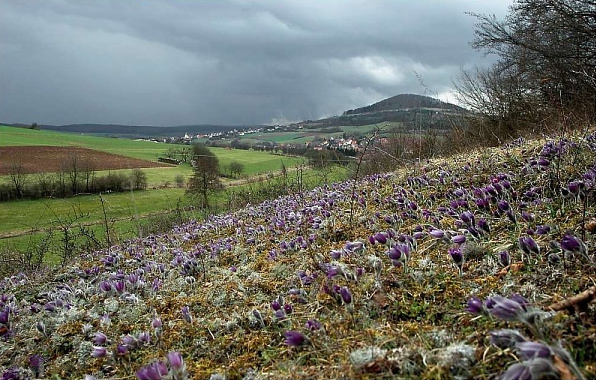
Semi-dry grassland (Mesobromion erecti) on a south-facing muschelkalk hillside in the Rhön Mountains, with rich communities of pasqueflower

Dry grassland is a habitat type that can be found across the world and has one of the most diverse plant communities in the world for its size.

== Characteristics ==
The key characteristic of dry grasslands is that they have low-growing plants, causing the area to be quite open. They also have a mottled structure, which leads to a biome with sunny or semi-shaded areas. It has soil is relatively dry and nutrient-poor, with some types of grasslands with a higher humus and nutrient content. The soil of these areas overlie acid rocks or deposits such as sands and gravels. Dry grasslands belong to different zones such as: the natural zonal or azonal/extrazonal vegetation and the semi-natural vegetation. Overall, there are 13 classes that fall under dry grasslands.

Dry grassland can be found all over the world, across ecological and geographical amplitudes, and in a wide variety of environments. Most dry grasslands are located in Northern America and Europe. Dry grasslands are widespread in Alaska and northern Canada in cold and dry climates. They are also present in nearly all European regions, other than the Far North. Many different types of environments are able to support the growth of dry grasslands, but they are rarely found on flat areas.

Since dry grasslands are found in various environments, they are able to survive in diverse climate conditions. They are mostly found in temperate to continental areas, which are characterized by warm summers and cold winters because of their wide annual temperature amplitude. Temperatures range from -4 to -6 °C in January and 18 to 20 °C in July, with mean annual temperatures of 7 to 9 °C. Mean annual precipitation ranges from 600 to 650 mm, with maximum precipitation occurring in May and June, and minimum precipitation occurring in January and February.

== Types of grasslands ==
There are four main types of grasslands, which differ slightly in their main characteristics and are found in different areas across the globe.

=== Zonal steppes ===
These dry grasslands are in lowland areas with temperate climate, receiving little precipitation (less than 450 mm per year). They are distributed through areas in Ukraine, Russia, Kazakhstan, and a few dry grassland areas are found in Bulgaria, Romania, Moldova, Georgia, Armenia, and Azerbaijan.

=== Alpine ===
These dry grasslands are found in European mountains, where the vegetation growth period is not long enough to sustain forest growth.

=== Azonal/extrazonal ===
These dry grasslands occur in areas where the zonal vegetation is forest, but with soil that is usually shallow, poorly developed and unstable, and therefore does not allow tree growth.

=== Semi-natural (secondary) ===
These dry grasslands represent the dominant type in most European countries, growing in places where the natural vegetation is forest. Many of these areas are present due to human land use in the past, which are now replaced by grasslands.

== Flora ==
Based on the environmental conditions of dry grasslands there are certain plants that inhabit these areas. The plants on dry grasslands have evolved certain adaptations to allow them to survive in such environments. They have adapted to the nutrient poor soil and the grazing of animals. Some plants in dry grassland have adaptations, such as thorns or a bad taste to avoid grazing, whereas others have grown in the zones that are out of reach of grazers.

The grazing of animals on dry grasslands creates a variety of habitats that allow a diverse number of species with habitat differentiation to grow. Around 50 species of plants can be found per square meter. If the overall balance between plants in the area is good, then the plants do not have the struggle for survival as they do not have to compete for natural resources such as light, water and nutrition. Once a seed has found a spot, it is able to grow there as long as it is able to withstand threats to it, such as grazing.

=== Grazing ===
Dry grasslands contain both endangered plant and animal species. Conservation of dry grasslands is of importance, to prevent the extinction of these species. A major problem in conservation is the lack of sufficient grazing. If grazing is not part of dry grasslands, then the area will turn into forests as other plant species take over and take the available nutrients needed for growth. The dry grassland plants are not able to compete with the taller herbs found in a typical forest. There is a decline in animals used for grazing, which results in the establishment of trees and bushes in dry grassland areas. As they grow bigger and larger, they start to block the sunlight from reaching the dry grassland species, causing them to die.

== Fauna ==
Dry grasslands have an extreme variability in terms of the species that are found there. These areas contain different types of mammals and a wide range of invertebrates.

=== Predators ===
Besides livestock, other mammals can also be found in dry grassland areas. It even is the biome with the highest density of Bengal foxes (Vulpes bengalensis) in the world, but because of the lack of attention to conservation of dry grassland, research suggest that the Indian fox might become a threatened species in the future. Besides Canidae like the Bengal fox, dry grassland can also be populated by Felidae and in particular Geoffroy's cat (Leopardus geoffroyi). This species can be found in the dry grasslands of Argentina and other parts of southern South America. Their main diet is small rodents, which are also common mammals in a dry grassland biome.

=== Rodents and lagomorphs ===
In dry grassland areas all over the world different rodents and lagomorphs can be found. Rodents like voles (Microtes), such as the long-tailed vole, are found in North-America. The plateau pika (Ochotona curzoniae) is a keystone species in the Alpine meadows on the Tibetan Plateau, which is an example of one of the rarer lagomorphs in dry grassland biomes. The burrows, which the plateau pika makes, are not only used by this species, but are also used by birds and lizards. Furthermore, they are a key prey animal for predators on the Tibetan plateau.

=== Insect and other small species ===
Insects and other small species are very common in dry grassland areas. For example, in Denmark 18,000 insect species can be found including half of all Danish butterfly species. Grasshoppers in the family Acrididae can commonly be found in these areas because of the relatively light rich environment. The lack of nutrients in the soil prevent larger plants and trees to grow, which gives the species in Acrididae a sufficient amount of light to complete their life cycle. This is consistent with the fact that dry grassland is known for specialist invertebrate species, that are not common anywhere else, such as hunting wasps and field cricket (Gryllus campestris). Dry grasslands are important habitats also for ants, where they act ecosystem engineers and contribute to their high biodiversity.

== Human interaction ==
In a lot of different countries with dry grassland areas the land is used for agriculture, which have an effect on the biome and the flora and fauna species living there. In Finland, for example, the grazing of livestock changed the structure of the landscape. This eventually resulted in a decline in species. In the United Kingdom many semi-natural dry grassland areas are used for agriculture, which creates conservation problems, such as the rare dry grassland species becoming extinct. Research suggests that, at least in Europe, a common solution should be looked for in order to conserve dry grassland areas.

=== Conservation status ===
Dry grassland areas are important to biodiversity as they contain a wide range of plant and animal species. European dry grasslands have the highest small-scale species densities amongst plant communities. This is why conservation efforts have become vital for dry grasslands, to ensure the continuance of its vast diversity and to help the many endangered species that these areas host.

Dry grasslands are highly threatened in Europe by factors such as: destruction for other activities, abandonment of traditional use, deforestation, eutrophication, or invasion of neophytes. The European Union has dry grasslands falling under the Habitats Directive. This directive ensures that threatened animals and plant species are conserved and protected. Another reason why dry grasslands are important is because they can be used as a model system for biodiversity.
