= 2024 Brazil wildfires =

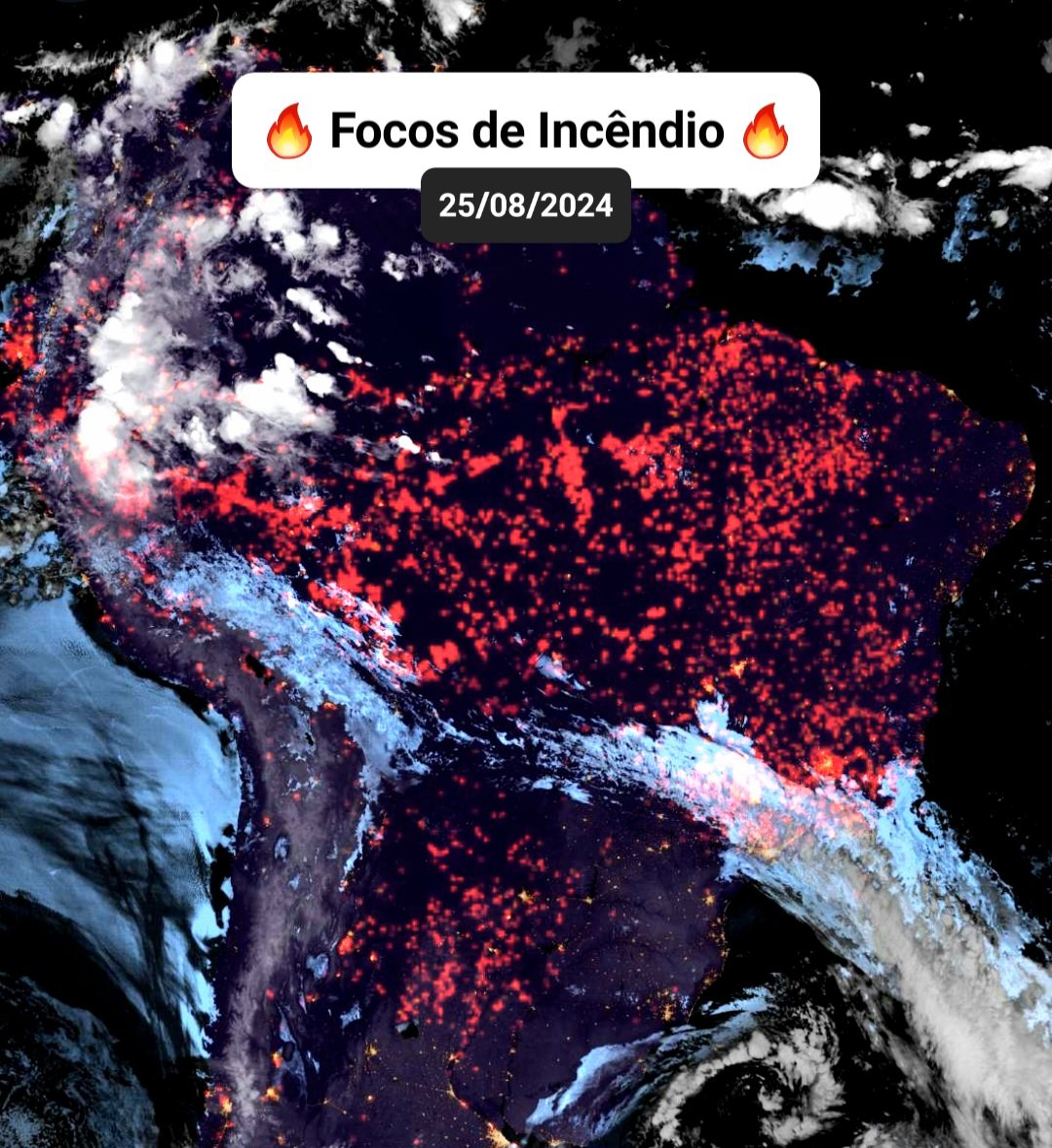
- Satellite image of the fires on 25 August 2024
- Location: Pantanal, Cerrado, Amazon rainforest

Statistics
- Total fires: 62,131
- Total area: ~46,101,798 hectares (113.92002 million acres)

Impacts
- Deaths: 2

In 2024, 62,131 wildfires detected by the Global Wildfire Information System (GWIS) burned an estimated 46,101,798 hectares (113,920,020 acres) of tropical wetland in Brazil's Pantanal in Mato Grosso do Sul, the Amazon rainforest, and the Cerrado, Specially São Paulo's interior. According to satellite data from the Brazilian National Institute for Space Research, the number of fires from 2024's beginning to 10 June showed a 935% increase compared to the same period in 2023 with 1,315 fires being reported compared to 127 fires in 2023.

== Background ==
Climate scientists noted that the 2024 Brazil wildfire season started earlier than typical seasons which start around July, and was also more intense this year due to decreased rainfall in certain regions leading to prolonged drought. Brazilian President Luiz Inacio Lula da Silva pledged to stop illegal deforestation in the Amazon by 2030 to help reduce the impact of global warming.

== Wildfires ==
On 1 July, collected satellite data indicated that at least 13,489 wildfires had occurred since the start of the year, the most wildfires in the first half of the year in 20 years, and up 61% from 2023. Brazilian Greenpeace spokesman Romulo Batista stated that global warming and decreased rainfall created dryer environments that caused vegetation to be more dry and thus be more susceptible to spreading fires throughout all parts.

=== Pará ===
On 27 August, the governor of Pará, Helder Barbalho, declared a state of emergency and prohibited the use of fire statewide due to the fires that are affecting cities throughout the state. The decree provides for the prohibition of the use of fire, including for cleaning and managing areas, throughout Pará, for a period of 180 days, with the possibility of being extended for the same period.

=== Pantanal ===
Throughout the first two weeks of June, 2,639 fires burned 32,000 hectares (79,000 acres) of the Pantanal wetlands, six times the highest number of fires in the region for June compared to any prior year. The number rose to over 760,000 hectares (1.9 million acres) by 9 July, burning over 4% of the 16.9 million hectares (42 million acres) of wetland. Massive areas of land bearing thick shrubbery and wildlife were burnt into a "carpet of white ash" with pieces of debris rising and falling around the affected areas. The intensity and range of the wildfires were exacerbated by strong winds blowing at up to 40 km per hour. The prominent fires threatened many of the natural fauna including anteaters, jaguars, tapirs, caimans, and anacondas. A total of 3,538 wildfires were recorded in the region up to 1 July, up 40% compared to 2020, the year with the most wildfires in the region. Efforts to extinguish the fires were complicated by high winds and the terrain of the wetlands making access and movement difficult.

The smoke from the wildfires caused several hospitals in Corumbá to fill with victims of smoke inhalation and respiratory symptoms, affecting children <5 years old) and senior citizens over 65 the worst. Animal rescue workers reported hundreds of animals were killed due to smoke inhalation and burns, which included frogs, snakes, monkeys, and jaguars.

On 31 August, IBAMA fined two companies more than R$ 100 million for a massive fire in the Pantanal caused by maintenance workers on a railway line in Corumbá. The fire, which started on 16 August and was brought under control on 23 August, destroyed more than 17,000 hectares (42,000 acres) of vegetation and affected 12 rural properties in the Porto Esperança region. The company responsible for the railway line was fined R$ 50 million for environmental damage and R$ 7.5 million for failure to comply with environmental licensing, while the outsourced company was fined R$ 50 million.

On 7 September, IBAMA authorized the sending of firefighters to Bolivia to combat forest fires that pose an imminent risk to the Pantanal.

=== Cerrado ===
The Cerrado had 13,229 wildfires occur in the first half of the year. The widespread fires caused the sky to fill with smoke clouds and turn a red color, according to residents.

=== São Paulo ===
Development of fires in São Paulo on 22 August 2024

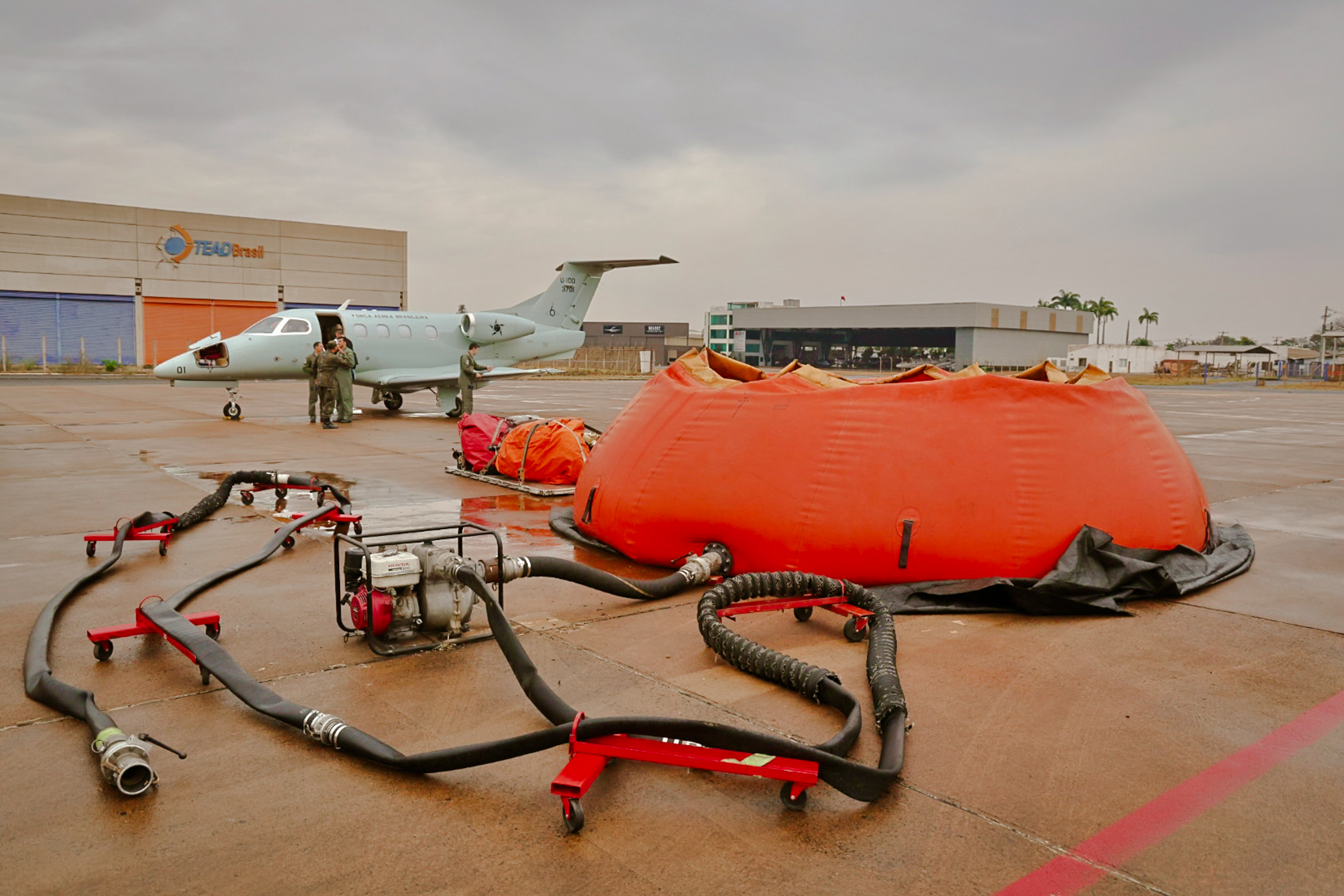
Firefighting operation being prepared at the Leite Lopes Airport on 25 August

In late August, wildfires caused by prolonged drought conditions and strong wind gusts impacted thirty cities in São Paulo state, either directly affecting them or burning near them. As a result, at least two people were killed at an industrial plant in Urupês while trying to contain a nearby wildfire.

On 24 August 2024, two matches of football were suspended after a municipal decree. The fires that hit the city of Ribeirão Preto and the region associated with the drought and extreme heat caused the suspension of the Copa Paulista and Série B do Brasileiro matches that were scheduled to take place in the same month in the city.

On 25 August 2024, São Paulo governor Tarcísio de Freitas confirmed the arrest of two people suspected of acting in arson attacks in the interior of São Paulo since the beginning of the task force to contain the spread of flames in the state. According to the Chief Executive, a suspect was arrested in the region of São José do Rio Preto on 24 of the same month and another was detained on 25 in Batatais, both in the state of São Paulo. The man arrested on day 25 is a 42-year-old mechanic, caught by the Military Police of São Paulo State while setting fire to a forest near the central region of Batatais after an anonymous tip. A bottle of gasoline, a lighter and his cell phone were seized from him. He was taken to the police station to give a statement. According to the investigation carried out at the scene, in videos found on the device, the man celebrated large-scale fires in the region.

On 26 August, in an interview to the program CBN São Paulo, transmitted by CBN Radio, Tarcísio stated that one of the people arrested for involvement in fires in Batatais, in the interior of São Paulo, “identified himself as a member of the Capital's First Command”. The state's Secretariat of Public Security reported that the perpetrator told the police that he was part of the criminal organization. On the same day, four men in Batatais, Guaraci, São José do Rio Preto and Jales were arrested on suspicion of participating in the fires that hit the interior of São Paulo.

On 27 August, a 32-year-old man was arrested on suspicion of setting fire to a wooded area on the banks of the Archimedes Lammoglia Highway (SP-075), in Salto.

On the night of 28 August, the Military Police of São Paulo State arrested two men suspected of setting fire to a vegetation area on the side of the Fábio Talarico Highway, in Franca.

In total, 20 people have been arrested for starting forest fires in the state of São Paulo since the first perpetrator was detained on 24 August.

=== Rio de Janeiro ===
On 13 September, a man was arrested after being caught setting fire to a wooded area in Vassouras, in the south of Rio de Janeiro. Moreover, a fire hit the oldest quilombo of the state, in Valença.

On 14 September, State Environment Secretary Bernardo Rossi announced the closure of all parks in Rio de Janeiro because of fires across the state.

=== Federal District ===
On the morning of 15 September, a forest fire began to spread through the region of the Brasília National Park, also known as the Mineral Water Park. In the early evening, the president of ICMBio, Mauro Pires, said that the fire is criminal. According to him, the fire started in Granja do Torto and continued towards the Brasília National Park.

== Response ==
In April, state authorities of Mato Grosso do Sul proclaimed an "environmental state of emergency" due to low levels of rainfall disrupting the usual seasonal flooding, exacerbating conditions for potential wildfires in many parts of the region.

Mato Grosso do Sul's state government would then issue an emergency declaration on 24 June. Brazil's federal government increased the size of its wildfire response taskforce, while Brazil's air force dropped 48,000 liters (11,000 imp gal; 13,000 U.S. gal) of water on July 6-7. Firefighter Cabo Sena reported that wildfires would often reignite within 24 hours of them being put out. Fire prevention leaflets were distributed to local civilians in the region of the wildfires, with several experts and citizens requesting that Brazil's government invests more in fire prevention education.

In August 2024, the Bolivian government has asked Brazil for support in fighting forest fires. In the Pantanal, a border area between the countries, the Serra do Amolar was recently hit by fire. The request for help was sent to the Brazilian Cooperation Agency (ABC) and is being evaluated by the Brazilian Ministry of Foreign Affairs.

== See also ==
- 2024 Argentina wildfires
- 2024 Peru wildfires
- 2024 South American wildfires
- 2023–2024 South American drought
- Wildfires in 2024
- 2020 Brazil rainforest wildfires
- 2019 Amazon rainforest wildfires
- 1967 Rio Doce State Park wildfire
- List of largest fires of the 21st century
