= 2024 South American wildfires =

- Date: January – October 2024
- Location: Primarily Bolivia, Brazil, Chile, Colombia, Ecuador, and Peru

Statistics
- Total fires: 346,112 hotspots
- Total area: 85,866,867 hectares (212.18165 million acres) per GWIS

Impacts
- Deaths: 148
- Injuries: 134

Ignition
- Cause: 2023–2024 South American drought; Climate change; Slash-and-burn tactics

The 2024 South American wildfires refer to a mega colossal series of wildfires that significantly impacted several neighboring South American countries, including Bolivia, Brazil, Chile, Colombia, Ecuador, and Peru. Based on Global Wildfire Information System satellite imaging, about 346,112 wildfire hotspots damaged or destroyed 85,866,867 hectares (~212,181,650 acres). The massive area burned was primarily caused by anthropogenic climate change and the resulting consequences of the 2023–2024 South American drought on fire conditions. The wildfires caused significant deforestation of the Amazon rainforest, and also impacted several other international biomes including the Pantanal wetlands, becoming the second largest series of wildfires in the 21st century next to the 2023–24 Australian bushfire season, with the 2024 Brazil wildfires alone reaching fourth in area burned.

== Background ==
Beginning in 2023, prolonged drought conditions impacted most of South America as a result of lighter seasonal rainfall in the Amazon and "warming of northern tropical Atlantic Ocean waters" and the Equatorial Pacific due to the El Niño–Southern Oscillation climate phenomenon. In addition, increased temperatures due to anthropogenic global warming from increased atmospheric CO_{2} and methane resulted in more severe climate phenomena, with September 2023 setting a global temperature record at the time.

In January 2024, the World Weather Attribution climate scientist initiative determined that the primary driver of the 2023 drought conditions was anthropogenic climate change as opposed to El Niño. The resulting increase in temperatures combined with a marked decrease in rainfall caused widespread evaporation of moisture from soil and plants, which in turn significantly exacerbated drought conditions and resulting wildfires. In the central regions of Brazil, temperatures reached 1 °C above the 1.5 °C average global increase, resulting in large amounts of rain evaporating before it could move deeper into the soil.

In May 2024, the Brazilian savannah of the Cerrado suffered from its worst drought in over 700 years based on geological research of stalagmites in the open entrance Onça Cave.

In August 2024, the Amazon had several of its rivers reach critically low water levels in the first weeks of its dry season, with several rivers in the southwest Amazon reaching their lowest point on record for their respective times of the year. The Amazon Cooperation Treaty Organization released a technical statement reporting that the Amazon basin had been significantly impacted by drought conditions, and anticipated that it would cause significant issues in its member states: "Bolivia, Brazil, Colombia, Ecuador, Guyana, Peru, Suriname and Venezuela."

== Wildfires ==
Satellite imaging detected 346,112 fire hot spots in 2024 by 11 September, exceeding the prior 2007 record of 345,322 hot spots since data began in 1998. As a result of the blazes, a massive diagonal corridor of smoke spread across the continent from Colombia to Uruguay.

=== Bolivia ===
Forest fires in Bolivia began in June, and began to grow out of control by August and September, destroying 4 million hectares (10 million acres) of grassland and forest areas in the departments of La Paz, Cochabamba, Beni, Santa Cruz, and Pando, while emitting significant amounts of smoke and air pollution. Many of the fires also blazed in the Amazon rainforest next to the border of Brazil, and next to colossal wildfires located in Brazil. Of the area burned, 60% was grassland and 40% was forest, and multiple protected areas were impacted.

==== Response ====
By early September, The Bolivian government declared a state of emergency for the entire nation, and 5,000 volunteer firefighters were assigned to mitigate the blazes. Bolivian Minister of Defense Edmundo Novillo requested international support, of which Brazil, Venezuela, and France stated that they would offer assistance.

=== Brazil ===
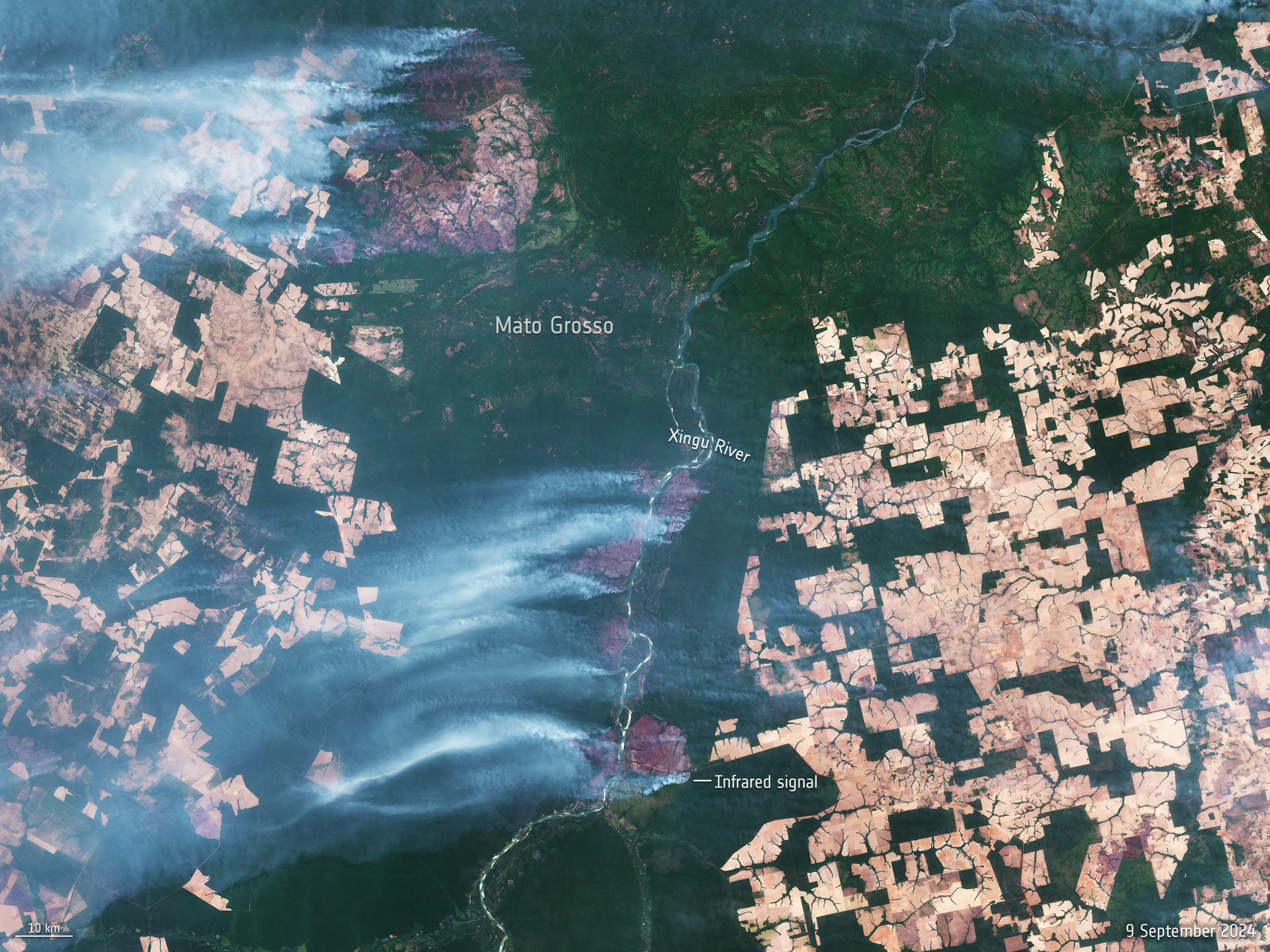
Satellite imaging of wildfires and smoke trails in the state of Mato Grosso in Brazil, taken on 9 September 2024.

In 2024, 53,302 wildfires detected by the Global Wildfire Information System (GWIS) burned an estimated 37,578,692 hectares (92,858,970 acres) of tropical wetland in Brazil's Pantanal in Mato Grosso do Sul, the Amazon rainforest, and the Cerrado.

Throughout the first two weeks of June, 2,639 fires burned 32,000 hectares (79,000 acres) of the Pantanal wetlands, six times the highest number of fires in the region for June compared to any prior year. The number rose to over 760,000 hectares (1.9 million acres) by 9 July, burning over 4% of the 16.9 million hectares (42 million acres) of wetland. The intensity and range of the wildfires were exacerbated by strong winds blowing at up to 40 km per hour. The prominent fires threatened many of the natural fauna including anteaters, jaguars, tapirs, caimans, and anacondas. A total of 3,538 wildfires were recorded in the region up to 1 July, up 40% compared to 2020, the year with the most wildfires in the region.

In late August, wildfires caused by prolonged drought conditions and strong wind gusts impacted thirty cities in São Paulo state, either directly affecting them or burning near them. As a result, at least two people were killed at an industrial plant in Urupês while trying to contain a nearby wildfire.

On 14 September, State Environment Secretary Bernardo Rossi announced the closure of all parks in Rio de Janeiro because of fires across the state.

==== Response ====
In April, state authorities of Mato Grosso do Sul proclaimed an "environmental state of emergency" due to low levels of rainfall disrupting the usual seasonal flooding, exacerbating conditions for potential wildfires in many parts of the region.

Mato Grosso do Sul's state government would then issue an emergency declaration on 24 June. Firefighter Cabo Sena reported that wildfires would often reignite within 24 hours of them being put out. Fire prevention leaflets were distributed to local civilians in the region of the wildfires, with several experts and citizens requesting that Brazil's government invests more in fire prevention education.

=== Chile ===
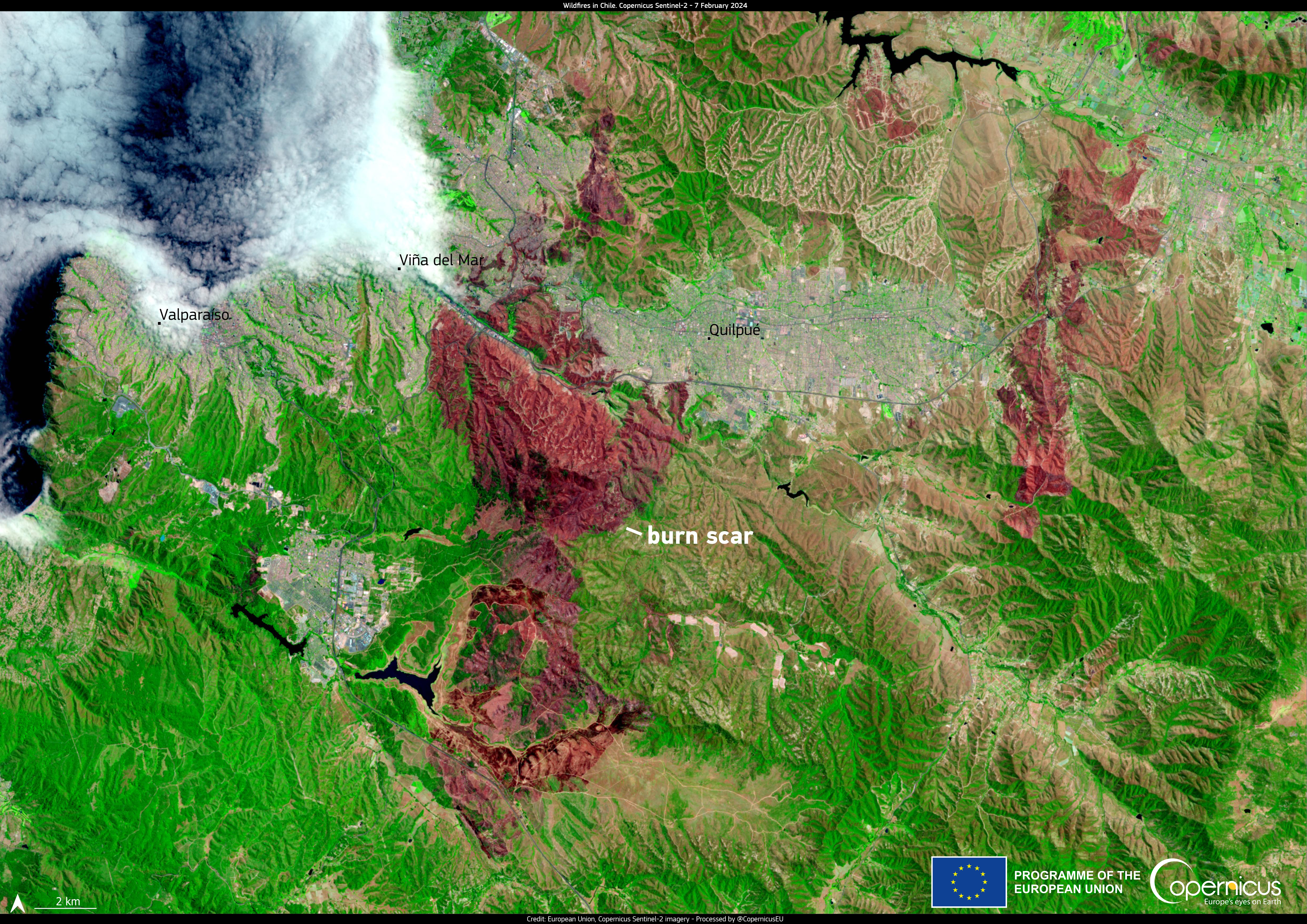
Modified satellite imaging showing burn scars in the Valparaíso area in Chile.

Deputy Interior Minister Manuel Monsalve reported on 4 February that there were 162 forest fires across central and southern Chile, following the presence of unusually high temperatures that reached up to 40 °C (104 °F) in the prior week, exacerbated by Chile's "mega-drought" that over the last decade. 43,000 hectares of land were affected.

As a result of the fires, a total of 131 people were killed, and at least 14,000 houses were affected by the fires in Viña del Mar and Quilpué. The fires were regarded as the deadliest in Chile's history, and the deadliest disaster in the country since the 2010 Chile earthquake.

==== Response ====
President Gabriel Boric declared a state of emergency on 3 February, and ordered the deployment of 1,300 military personnel alongside 31 firefighting aircraft and 1,400 firefighters. In May 2024, a firefighter and a CONAF employee were arrested on suspicion of starting the fires in Valparaiso Region. The government of Mexico sent a team of 30 firefighters from the National Forestry Commission and 127 Army and Air Force personnel, together with 26 tons of food supplies.

=== Colombia ===
A series of more than 340 forest fires began in Colombia in January, burning 900 m (3,000 ft) of residential areas and affecting 174 municipalities in the country.

In mid-September, Colombia's National Risk Management Unit reported 20 active fires in Colombia that had destroyed 12,800 hectares (32,000 acres) of forests, most of which were located in the departments of Tolima and Huila.

=== Ecuador ===
Beginning in August 2024, several wildfires began to spread in Ecuador, including in Guayaquil, Loja, and Quito. By September, 10,980 hectares were destroyed by the wildfires. In order to help control the blazes, the government of Peru sent its personnel and aircraft to help mitigate the forest fires.

=== Peru ===
Wildfires first began to appear in Peru during July 2024. Peru's Ministry of the Environment stated that many wildfires were regularly caused between August and November by farmers' and land traffickers' burning of dry grasslands in order to increase the amount of land open for sale or agriculture.

By 15 September, 222 fire emergencies were reported, the largest of which were detected in the departments of Amazonas, Ancash, Cuzco, Madre de Dios, San Martin, and Ucayali. Peru's civil defense reported that as a result of the widespread wildfires, at least fifteen civilians were killed and 134 more were injured.

Prime Minister of Peru Gustavo Adrianzén reported that aerial firefighting efforts were strongly hindered by the presence of smoke from the wildfires, along with high cloud cover and strong winds. He also pleaded to farmers and the rest of Peru to stop burning grasslands, stating that "All the fires that are happening nationwide have been started by humans".

== Management ==
At the local level, together with the inhabitants of the affected areas, some institutional responses were activated and groups of people were deployed to confront the fires. These groups include national fire brigades in each of the countries, military groups, and other groups specialized in emergencies and natural disasters, such as for Civil Defense and the Red Cross.

== Controversies ==
- Despite being recognized worldwide as a fundamental area for the sustainability of the planet and being a legal subject of protection in several countries, the Amazon region is at high risk of forest fires. In 2023 alone in the protected area known as the Amazônia Legal, more than 127,000 wildfires were recorded, while in 2022, 145,100 outbreaks were reported.
- Media coverage sometimes focuses on identifying potential culprits for the spread of fires, and deepens existing land conflicts in the region. Among the actors involved in these environmental conflicts are those who practice intensive agriculture and livestock farming, who exert pressure on local governments, those who slash and burn their lands to cultivate them, whether on small or large tracts, and those who practice sustainable agriculture and non-intensive land use, who are generally indigenous or peasant communities holding collective land rights.

== See also ==
- 2025 South American wildfires
- 2023–2024 South American drought
- 2019 Amazon rainforest wildfires
- List of largest fires of the 21st century
