= Russian wildfires =

Russian wildfires may refer to:

- 2010 Russian wildfires
- 2015 Russian wildfires
- 2018 Russian wildfires
- 2019 Russian wildfires
- 2020 Russian wildfires
- 2021 Russia wildfires
- 2024 Russian wildfires
- 2025 Russian wildfires
