= 2019 Russian wildfires =

Spate of forest fires in Russia

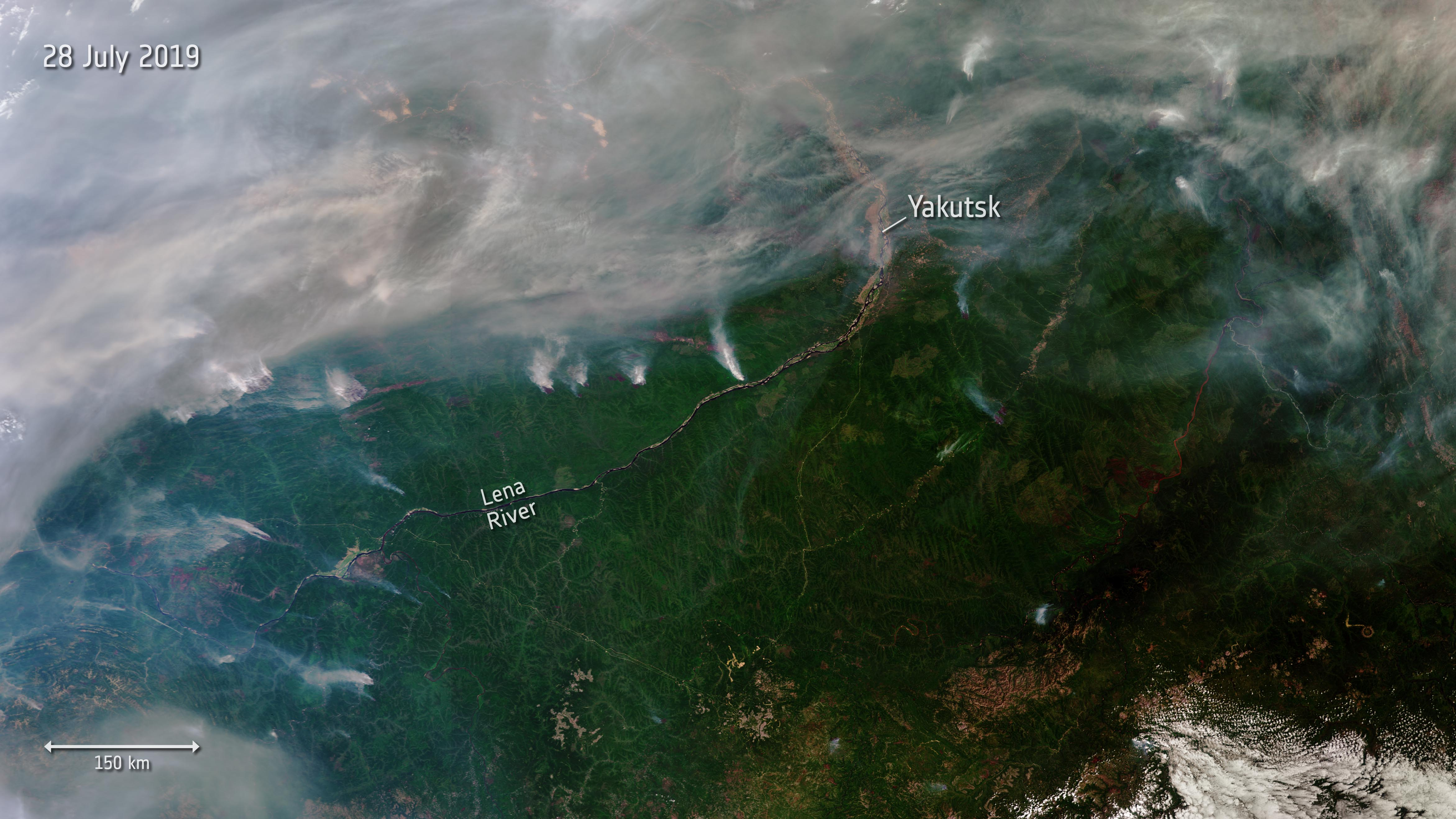
- Sentinel-3 satellite view of 2019 wildfires

Statistics
- Total area: 3,000,000 hectares (7,400,000 acres)

Impacts
- Deaths: None reported

The 2019 Siberian wildfires are the large-scale wildfires that occurred across Russian Siberia between June and September 2019 and were among the most extensive and destructive in the region's recent history. By the end of the month the size of the fires reached 2,600,000 hectares (6,400,000 acres). The wildfires were primarily concentrated in Yakutia (Sakha Republic), Krasnoyarsk Krai, Irkutsk Oblast, and Buryatia. The total burned area and number of fires exceeded the annual average by approximately 1.5 times, ranking among the most severe wildfires recorded in the past two decades. By mid-August, the cumulative area affected by fires had surpassed 5,000,000 hectares (12,000,000 acres).

The fires produced dense smoke plumes, which spread over major cities across Siberia, the Urals, and Kazakhstan, significantly deteriorating air quality. As of 30 July, there had been no reported deaths or injuries due to the fires.

The 2019 Siberia wildfires generated significant publicity, especially among social media users. As a result, a process of reviewing legal regulations regarding forest protection and forest fire extinguishing activities was started at the state level.

== Reasons ==
In June 2019, average monthly temperatures in the Krasnoyarsk krai, the northern regions of the Irkutsk oblast and Buryatia significantly exceeded the norm due to the prolonged dominance of anticyclones. Temperature anomalies ranged from 2.5 to 4 degrees (according to other data, they were almost ten degrees higher than the average of 1981-2010).)

Several regions experienced precipitation levels below seasonal norms accompanied by sustained high-velocity winds. This combination of meteorological factors significantly elevated both the ignition potential and spreading risk for wildfires.

== Extent ==
On 31 July 2019, Russian authorities reported that 3 million hectares (7.4 million acres; 30,000 km^{2}) were on fire, an area roughly the size of Belgium.

The smoke from the fires affected air quality in much of Siberia, including cities Novosibirsk, Krasnoyarsk, Omsk and other. Air travel was also disrupted. According to NASA data, on 31 July the smoke from burning Siberian forests reached the territory of Alaska and, possibly mixed with smoke from local fires, reached the western coast of Canada.

As most of the area affected was in uninhabited and/or poorly accessible areas, most of the fires are not being attended by firefighters. As of 6 August, Russia's Aerial Forest Protection Service was fighting 161 fires on 140,000 ha (350,000 acres), and only monitoring others. The smoke from the fires made aerial firefighting unsafe. In 2020, extreme heat fueled enormous outbreaks of wildfires in the Arctic Circle exceeding the 2019 record for CO_{2} emissions. In 2021, Siberia was hit again by extraordinary dry weather, record forest fires and smog.

== Reactions ==
On 1 August, Prime Minister Dmitry Medvedev ordered an investigation into the accusation that fires were started intentionally to conceal illegal logging. Officials in Krasnoyarsk were under investigation for neglecting to fight the fires. Medvedev also proposed revising regulatory acts in the field of extinguishing fires in regions including control zones, and instructed to consult with foreign experts in developing proposals to fight with wildfires, while US president Donald Trump offered Russia help in extinguishing the wildfires.

== See also ==
- 2024 Russian wildfires
- 2021 Russian wildfires
- 2018 Russian wildfires
- 2015 Russian wildfires
- 2010 Russian wildfires
- August curse
- Climate change in Russia
- List of wildfires
