= 2025 Russian wildfires =

Significant forest fires across Russia

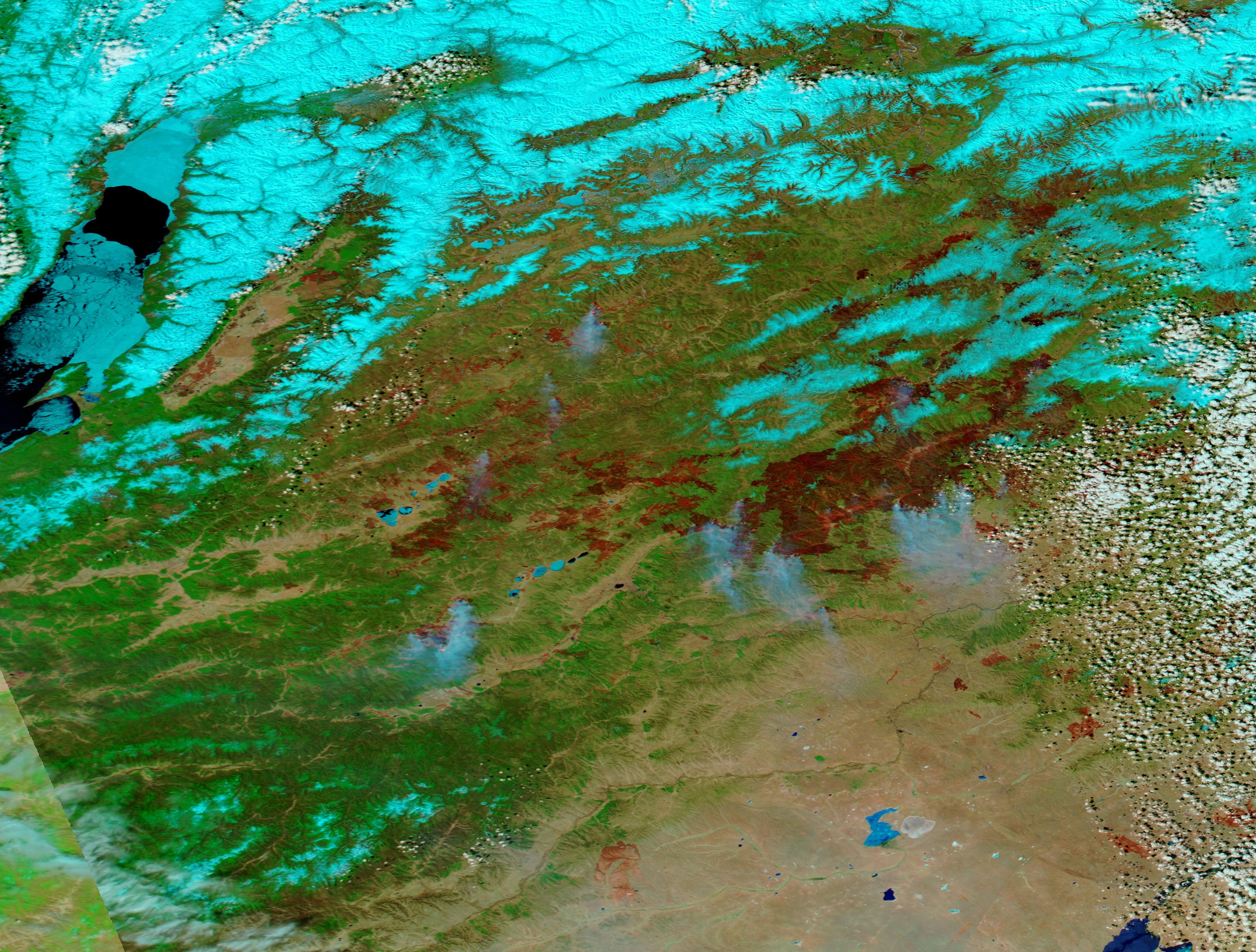
- Satellite imaging from NASA's Aqua satellite showing widespread wildfires and burn scars in Russia's Far East, taken on May 5, 2025
- Date: April 2025 – ongoing
- Location: Russian Far East, primarily Zabaykalsky Krai and Buryatia

Statistics
- Total fires: 174+
- Total area: 629,000 hectares (1,550,000 acres)

Impacts
- Deaths: 3

Ignition
- Cause: Exceptionally dry conditions, exacerbated by grass burning practices

In 2025, wildfires ignited and spread across large areas of Russian territory, primarily in the Russian Far East. The scope of the wildfires was attributed to meteorological conditions such as exceptionally dry weather, strong winds, and elevated temperatures. Rural grass burning practices resulted in the ignition of about 90% of wildfires in the Republic of Buryatia.

As of 13 May 2025, the wildfires have encompassed at least 629,000 hectares (1,550,000 acres) of land, and caused the deaths of three firefighters.

== Wildfires ==
Several regional meteorological factors in the Russian Far East, including diminished snow accumulation during the preceding winter and an early onset of spring, created extended dry periods conducive to fire ignition and spread. Fire conditions were exacerbated by strong winds and elevated temperatures.

A national-level emergency declaration was issued for Zabaykalsky Krai in April 2025. The Russian Ministry of Emergency Situations confirmed on 13 May that wildfires in this region had consumed approximately 576,000 hectares (1,420,000 acres) of territory.

On 13 May 2025, the Republic of Buryatia, a Siberian federal subject of the Russian Federation bordering Zabaykalsky Krai, implemented a region-wide emergency declaration in response to escalating wildfire activity. At the time of the emergency declaration, approximately 53,000 hectares (130,000 acres) of land were actively burning throughout the republic. According to documentation from the regional Forestry Agency, human negligence that included the practice of burning dry grass initiated roughly 90% of 174 recorded forest fires.

State-run media agency RIA Novosti reported on 13 May that a substantial fire approached a major highway in Amur Oblast, also located in the Russian Far East region.

== Responses ==
On 23 April 2025, Russian authorities declared a federal emergency in the Transbaikal region. Buryatia explicitly forbade practices that could potentially ignite new fires, including grass burning operations, trash or refuse incineration, or any type of outdoor cooking utilizing open flames.

By 2 May, up to 813 firefighters were deployed to Zabaykalsky Krai to combat wildfires in the region. Three firefighters were killed by a wildfire in Tungokochensky District.

== See also ==
- 2020 Russian wildfires
- 2021 Russian wildfires
- 2022 Siberian wildfires
- Russian mystery fires (2022–present)
- 2024 Russian wildfires
