= 2018 Russian wildfires =

Series of fires in Siberia, Russia

Impacts
- Deaths: None reported

Dry, warm conditions in the spring set the stage for fires in Siberia in May 2018.

== History ==
In mid-July 2018, smoke from the fires could be seen by satellites reaching North America. The Siberian Times reported 321,255 hectares (793,840 acres) were burning.

On July 24, the U.S. National Weather Service said smoke had crossed the Canada-U.S. border and reached Bellingham, Washington. Siberian fires were partly blamed by Environment Canada which issued an air quality statement on July 25 for Prince George, BC. On July 29, the Puget Sound Clean Air Agency stated the Puget Sound region would experience "moderate air quality at times with some upper level smoke making for pretty sunsets. This smoke comes from distant fires, mostly originating from Siberia."

== See also ==
- 2024 Russian wildfires
- 2021 Russian wildfires
- 2019 Russian wildfires
- 2015 Russian wildfires
- 2010 Russian wildfires
- 1987 Black Dragon fire
- List of wildfires § Russia
- List of heat waves
