= 2015 Russian wildfires =

Series of wildfires in Siberia, Russia

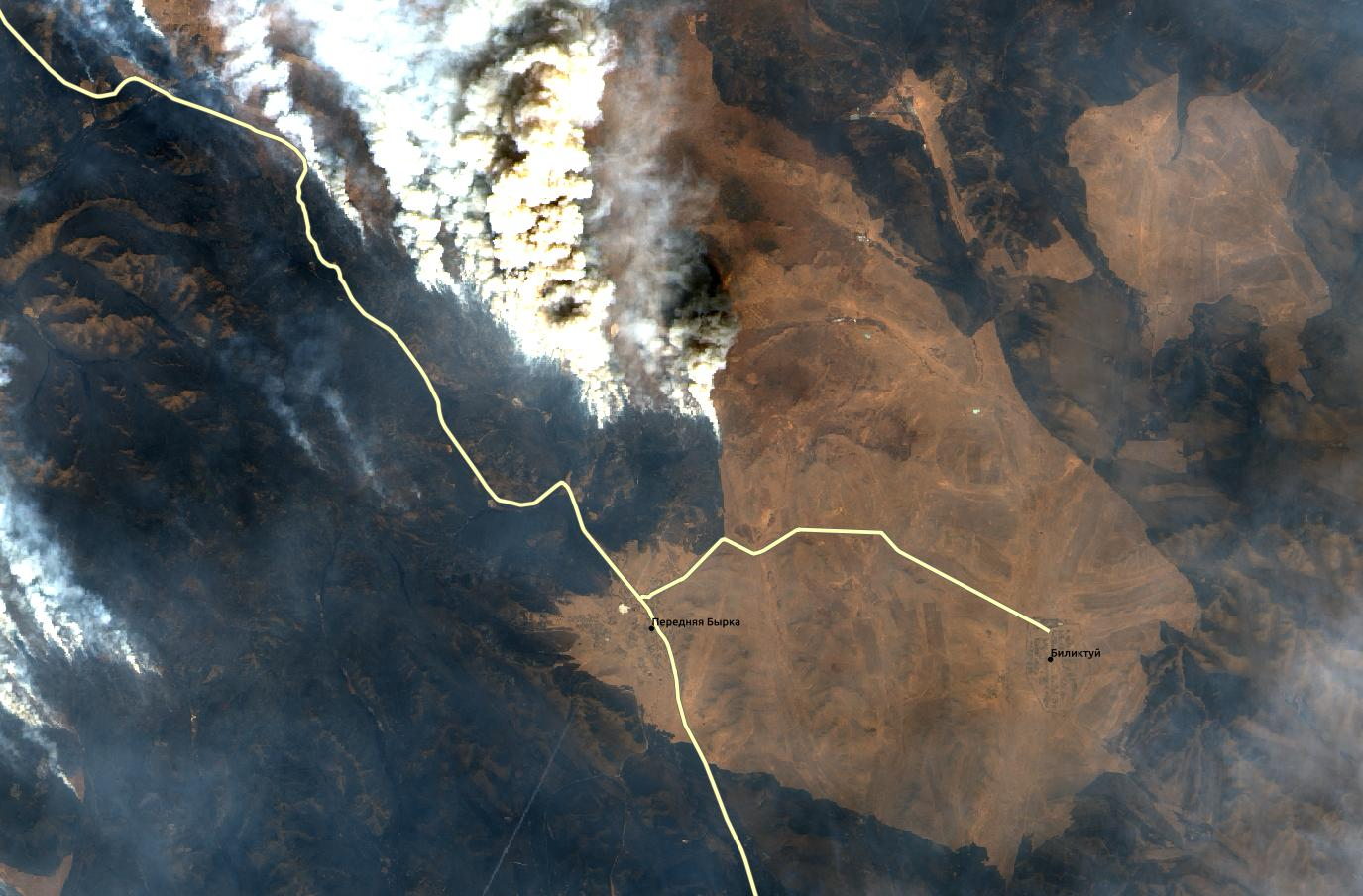
- Landsat 8 natural color image of wildfire in Peryednaya Byrka, Zabaikalskiy Krai, Russia from 14 April 2015
- Date: mid April 2015
- Location: Republics of Khakassia and Zabaykalsky Krai, Russia; Inner Mongolia, China

Statistics
- Burned area: >11,000 square kilometres (4,200 sq mi; 1,100,000 ha)
- Land use: Villages, farmland, woodlands

Impacts
- Deaths: 33
- Injuries: 900+
- Structures destroyed: 1440+

Ignition
- Cause: Agricultural land clear

From 12 to 16 April 2015, a series of wildfires spread across southern Siberia, Russia. In the Republic of Khakassia, 29 people were killed and 6,000 left homeless. Further east in Zabaykalsky Krai, four people died in wildfires near Chita. Damage was also reported in Inner Mongolia.

== Wildfires ==
The series of wildfires began on Sunday morning, 12 April in Khakassia as intentional fires set to clear grass for agriculture were caught by strong winds and got out of control. Warm, dry weather help spread the fires, which quickly spread into the region's forests; daytime temperatures had reached 25 °C and spreading waves of flames soared to 3 meters in height. Russian television said the fires could be seen from space on satellite imagery. At 1 p.m. local time (6:00 GMT), a state of emergency was declared. Fire control planes and helicopters were dispatched by the Ministry of Emergency Situations, but the fires were not completely extinguished until around 6:00 a.m. on 13 April.

Separately, 86 wildfires were reported in Zabaykalsky Krai from 13–14 April. Fires approached the city of Chita, threatening to ignite an arms dump. Visibility was reduced to 200–300 m. Eyewitnesses described the scene as "an apocalypse" as Chita was filled with smoke for days. An estimated 1,850 military personnel and volunteers worked to extinguish the fires. According to The Kremlin, Vladimir Putin personally took charge of coordinating disaster response. The fires were reported out on 15 April; however, the report was incorrect and fires remained ongoing on 16 April.

Chinese media reports said the fires also spread into Inner Mongolia.

== Impact ==
The wildfires killed at least 29 people in Khakassia, with three people unaccounted for as of 16 April. Approximately 900 others were injured. Seventy-seven people were hospitalized, with eight in critical condition as of 14 April. Approximately 1,300 homes across 34 villages were damaged, leaving roughly 6,000 people homeless. The town of Shira (near Lake Shira) was hardest hit, with 420 homes burned to the ground. As of 16 April, approximately 800 people across Khakassia remained in hospitals or emergency shelters. Livestock losses were estimated at 5,000 cattle and sheep, with the possibility of more deaths from starvation due to lack of grass to eat. More than 10,000 km^{2} of land was burnt in the fires. The Khakassia government designated 14 April as an official day of mourning. In the aftermath of the fires, looters were seen stealing bicycles, pipes, and other metal objects to sell as scrap metal.

In Zabaykalsky Krai, four deaths were reported. About 20 people were injured, with one person hospitalized. Over 150 homes across 19 villages were damaged, leaving more than 800 people homeless. An estimated 107,000 hectares of land was burnt.

In Inner Mongolia, 85 buildings were damaged as well as farming equipment and other vehicles. The damage there was estimated at US$3.2 million.

The Federal Forestry Agency blamed local officials for failing to follow agency guidelines for preventing wildfires. Alexei Yaroshenko, a Greenpeace forest expert, demanded that Emergency Situations Minister Vladimir Puchkov and regional Governor Viktor Zimin be punished for the incident. Deputy Emergency Minister Alexander Chupriyan blamed carelessness by citizens saying, "This fire would not have happened if no one played with matches." At least five criminal cases related to the fires have been filed. Authorities did not rule out that some of the fires may have been set by arsonists.

== See also ==
- 2010 Russian wildfires
- 2018 Russian wildfires
- 2021 Russian wildfires
- 2024 Russian wildfires
