= 2010 Bolivia forest fires =

Series of wildfires in Bolivia

- Date: 15 August 2010 – present
- Location: Bolivia

Statistics
- Land use: forest

Impacts
- Structures lost: 60

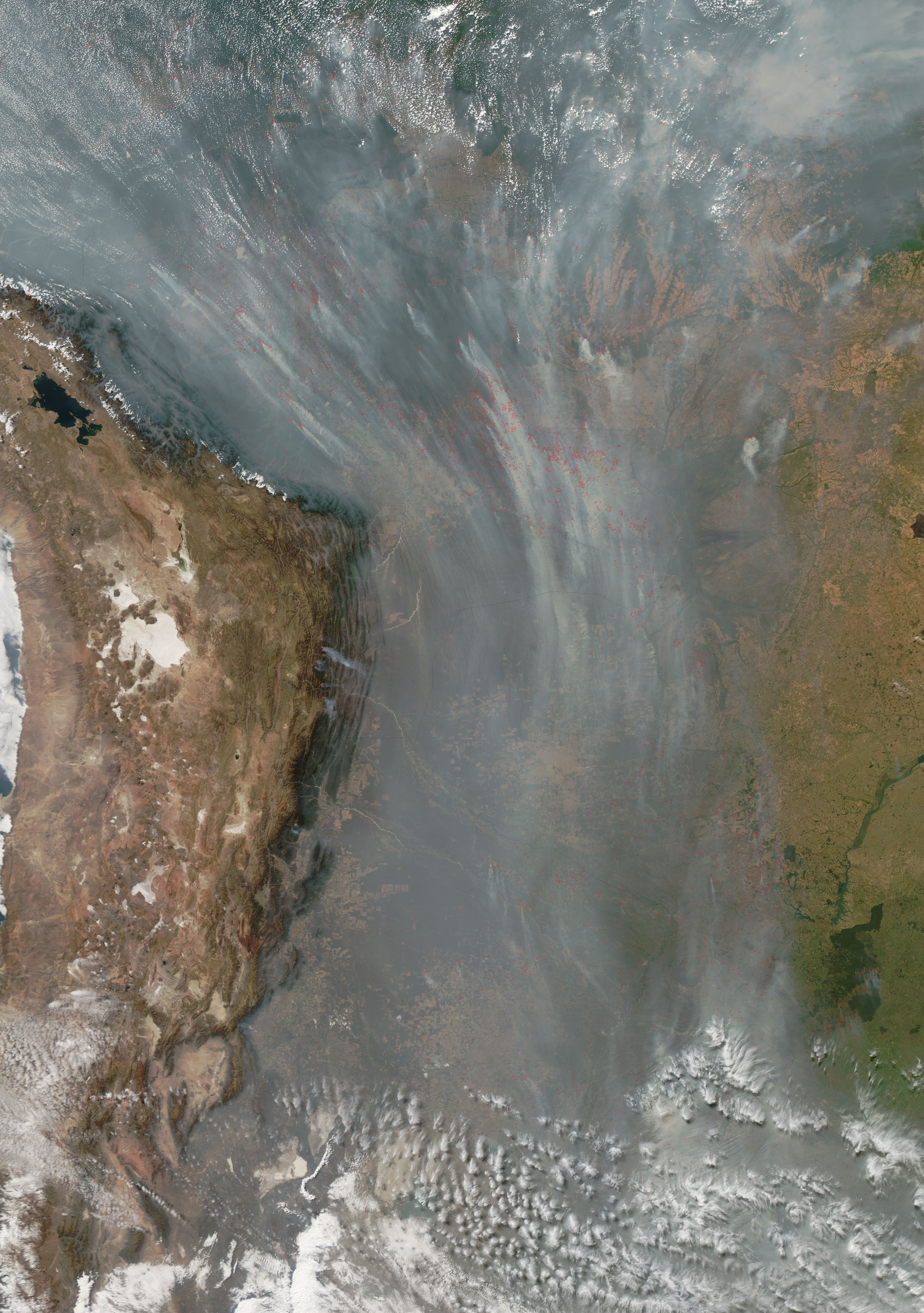
The fires are outlined in red in this satellite image.

The 2010 Bolivia forest fires led the country's government to declare a state of emergency, as wildfires spread across the country. More than 25,000 fires are burning across 15,000 square kilometres (3,700,000 acres). These raging fires have destroyed nearly sixty homes. Bolivia is unable to combat the fires properly as it does not have enough water bombing aircraft.

There was a steep jump in fire hot-spots from 17,000 on Sunday August 15 to approximately 25,000 three days later. Some of the blazes were so strong that firefighters were unable to get close enough to contain them. The head of Bolivia's forestry service, Weimar Becerra, described the fires as "a total disaster, it is an environmental disaster. We have six forest fires which have a height of 50 m and are growing, and as a country we do not have the capacity to put them out".

== Damage ==
Currently the worst of the damage has been to the country's section of the Amazon. The fire is largest in the eastern part along the country's border with Brazil. Smoke from the fires has halted numerous flights and forced many smaller airports to close temporarily. Despite being enveloped in smoke, Bolivia's main international airport in Santa Cruz has stayed open, while 23 regional airports have been closed down. According to Cliver Rojas from Bolivia's forests/land department, the most affected region was the Amazonian province of Pando in the north.

== Help from neighboring countries ==
The President of Bolivia, Evo Morales, said that he requested that his neighboring countries, Brazil and Argentina, help with the efforts, but, as of August 21, 2010, help had not been received.

== Cause ==
Farmers using fire to clear land for planting combined with extreme drought caused the plants to dry out, allowing the fires to run rampant.

== See also ==
- List of wildfires
- Other major wildfires in 2010
  - Schultz Fire, was a wildfire which burned over 15,000 acres (61 km^{2}), in Arizona, United States during June 2010.
  - Russian wildfires, are a series of hundreds of wildfires that broke out across Russia, starting in late July 2010.
  - California wildfires, are a series of seasonal wildfires active in the state of California, USA, during the year 2010.
  - Quebec wildfires, were a series of wildfires that affected over 90,000 hectares (220,000 acres) in Quebec, Canada, from late May to June 2010.
- 2010 Northern Hemisphere summer heat wave, is a severe heat wave that is impacting several countries worldwide during May, June, July and August 2010.
