= 2021 Russian wildfires =

Forest fires in northern Russia

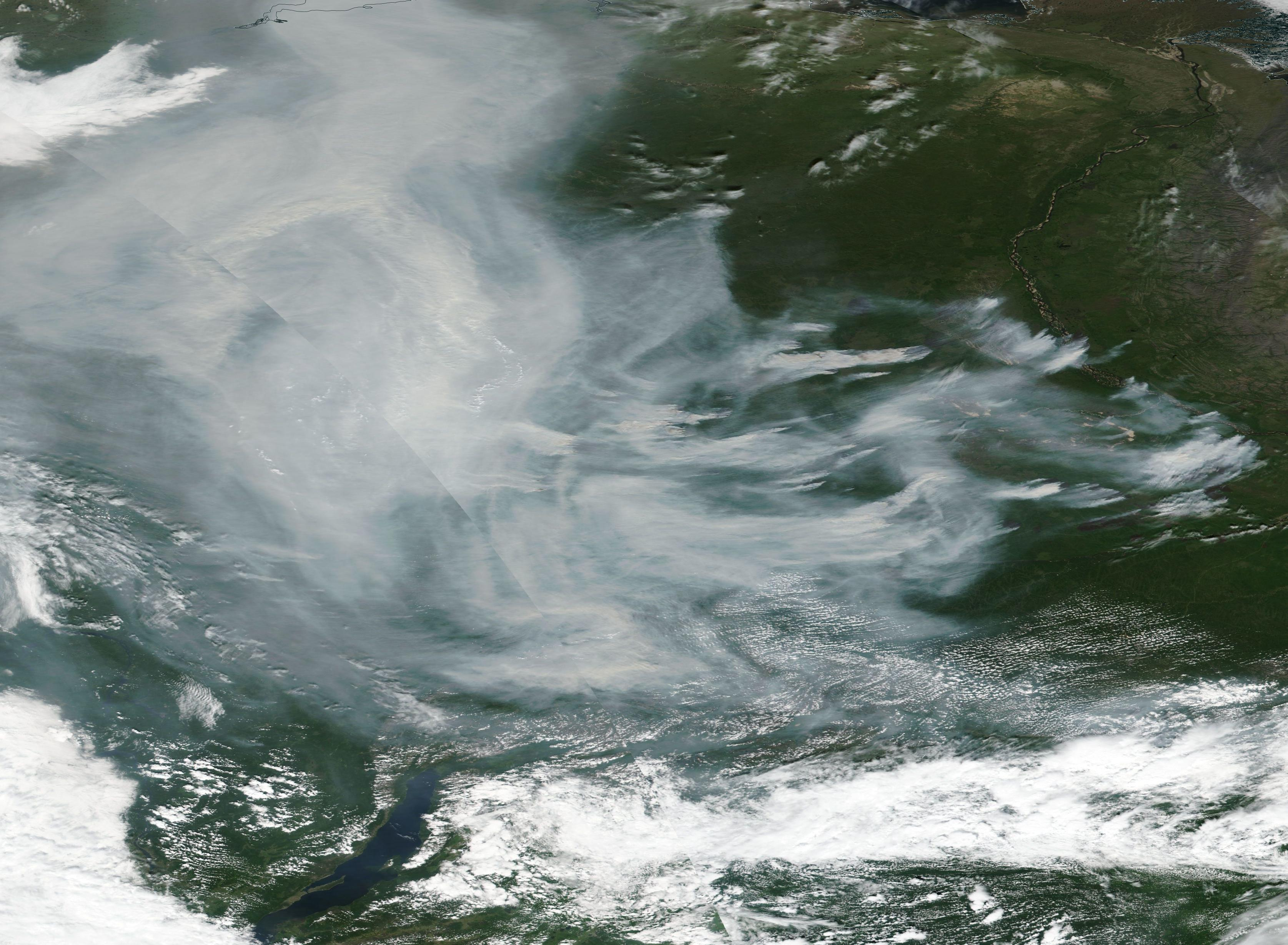

From June 2021, the taiga forests in Siberia and the Far East region of Russia were hit by unprecedented wildfires, following record-breaking heat and drought. For the first time in recorded history, wildfire smoke reached the North Pole.

== Events ==
=== Siberia ===
In Yakutia, according to the Republic of Sakha's emergencies ministry, more than 250 fires were burning across roughly 5720 square kilometers of land on July 5. NASA's Aqua satellite also captured images of large fires raging in Kamchatka. In the city of Yakutsk, toxic smoke produced by the fires blanketed the city, reducing air quality to levels described as an "airpocalypse". Fires and smokes forced the Kolyma highway to be closed. A state of emergency was declared, and military planes and helicopters were used to douse the fires and to seed clouds to bring down rainfall. Boats along the River Lena were suspended. Aisen Nikolayev, head of the republic, said the fires were mainly an effect of climate change, and that there had been unusually low rainfall. The Aerial Forest Protection Service said in July that more than half the fires were not being fought.

On August 4, smoke originating from the Siberian wildfires was reported in Ulaanbaatar, Mongolia, over 2,000 kilometers (around 1,200 miles) south-west from the place where the fires originated. The hourly average concentration, measured at 3pm that same day, reached 103 μg/m^{3} for the PM2.5 particles, while the one for PM10 particles hit 168 μg/m^{3}. The average daily concentration for PM2.5 was found to have been somewhere between 38 and 69 μg/m^{3}, exceeding the WHO's 24-hour mean air quality guidelines by 1.5 to 2.8 times. Smoke coming from the Siberian fires invaded the capital city again on August 10, albeit less intensely. The national meteorological institute stated on one of the articles on their website that the particle concentration was expected to decrease on August 12.

As of August 12, the Siberian fires were larger than all other fires ongoing across the world combined. NASA also noted that the wildfire smoke had travelled more than 3,000 km (1,864 mi) from Yakutia to reach the North Pole, a feat that "appears to be a first in recorded history".

=== Karelia ===
Fires were unexpected.

== Causes ==
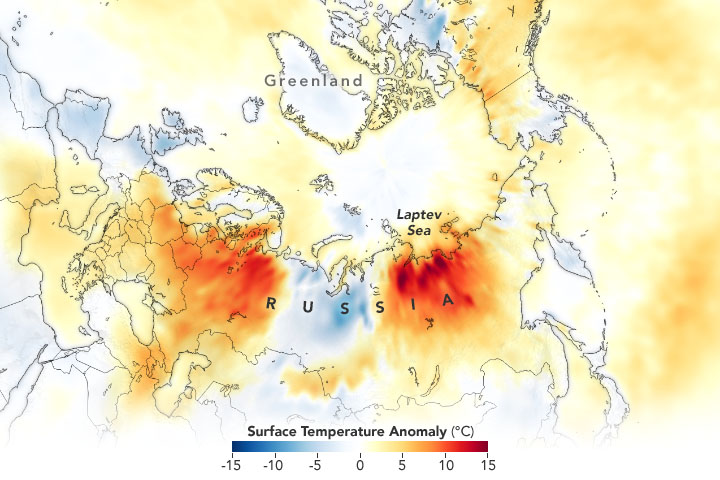
Surface Temperature Anomaly (°C) June 18–25 of 2021 compared to average temperatures of the same time period 2003-2013

Causes of the fires include monitoring difficulties, the shifting patterns of the jet stream and climate change in Russia. The fires were one of several extreme weather events that occurred globally in 2021.

Activists and experts say that fires are often set deliberately to cover up evidence of illegal lumbering or to create new places for timber harvesting under the false pretext of clearing burned areas. Activists in Siberia and the Far East allege such arson is driven by strong demand for timber in the colossal Chinese market, and they have called for a total ban on timber exports to China. Officials have acknowledged the problem and pledged to tighten oversight, but Russia's far-flung territory and regulatory loopholes make it hard to halt the illegal activity.

== Long-term effects ==
Large amounts of carbon may be released from formerly frozen ground under the fires, especially peatlands which continued burning from the previous year.

== See also ==
- 2024 Russian wildfires
- 2019 Russian wildfires
- 2018 Russian wildfires
- 2015 Russian wildfires
- 2010 Russian wildfires
- 1987 Black Dragon fire
- List of wildfires § Russia
- List of heat waves
