= 2022 Siberian wildfires =

Spate of forest fires in Russia

- Map of Russian regions affected by fires
- Date: 6 May 2022 – summer 2022
- Location: Krasnoyarsk Krai, Altai Krai, Irkutsk Oblast, Kemerovo Oblast, Omsk Oblast, Kurgan Oblast, Khakassia, Khanty-Mansi Autonomous Okrug, Tyumen Oblast, Sakha Republic

Impacts
- Deaths: 17

Ignition
- Cause: careless handling of fire, short circuits of power lines and substations, or fires of dry grass

The 2022 Siberian wildfires were a series of wildfires in Russia that began in Siberia in early May 2022. Fires were concentrated in the Krasnoyarsk, Altai, Irkutsk, Kemerovo, Omsk, Kurgan regions, Khakassia and Sakha republics.

== Overview ==
Possible causes of fires are careless handling of fire during picnics on May holidays, short circuits of power lines and substations or fires of dry grass. Three employees of the power distributor Krasnoyarskenergo have been arrested and charged with manslaughter.

As of 11 May, 1,298 buildings in 60 settlements burned down, including 200 homes, and at least 13 people died, including one child. In the city of Krasnoyarsk, the authorities had found that the fine particle concentrations in the air has exceeded levels considered hazardous to human health due to the smoke from wildfires. An Omsk civil association account stated on Twitter that the governor of the region is busy holding pro-Putin festivals and there is no clear action from the regional Emergency Situations Ministry.

President of Russia Vladimir Putin urged authorities to take stronger actions to prevent further spread of wildfire. It is argued that they are uncontrolled due to resources diverted for the 2022 Russian invasion of Ukraine. Smoke from the wildfires reached the western United States and worsened air quality on the coast of California.

== Further fires in 2023 ==
The total area of fires in 2023 was estimated at 5.2 million hectares. On 3 July 2023 a state of emergency was declared in Russia's far east. More than 110 forest fires were burning across 62,000 hectares.

== See also ==
- Russian mystery fires (2022–present)
- 2024 Russian wildfires
