= 2020 Russian wildfires =

Series of fires in Russia

In June 2020, despite being within the Arctic Circle, Verkhoyansk hit a temperature of 100.4 °F (38.0 °C). In Russia's two easternmost districts, 18,591 distinct fires have consumed 14 million hectares (35 million acres).

Fires are releasing record levels of carbon dioxide, partly because they are burning ancient peatlands that have been a carbon sink. A study published last month shows that northern peatlands could eventually shift from being a net sink for carbon to a net source of carbon, further accelerating climate change.
The unprecedented Arctic wildfires of 2019 and 2020 show that transformational shifts are already under way, says Thomas Smith, an environmental geographer at the London School of Economics and Political Science. "Alarming is the right term."

In September 2020 scientists warned that an "international effort is needed to manage a changing fire regime in the vulnerable Arctic", reporting that satellite data shows how the Arctic fire regime is changing. On 3 September EU institutions reported that, according to satellite data, the Arctic fires already far surpassed the total of CO_{2} emissions for the 2019 season.
