= 2024 Russian wildfires =

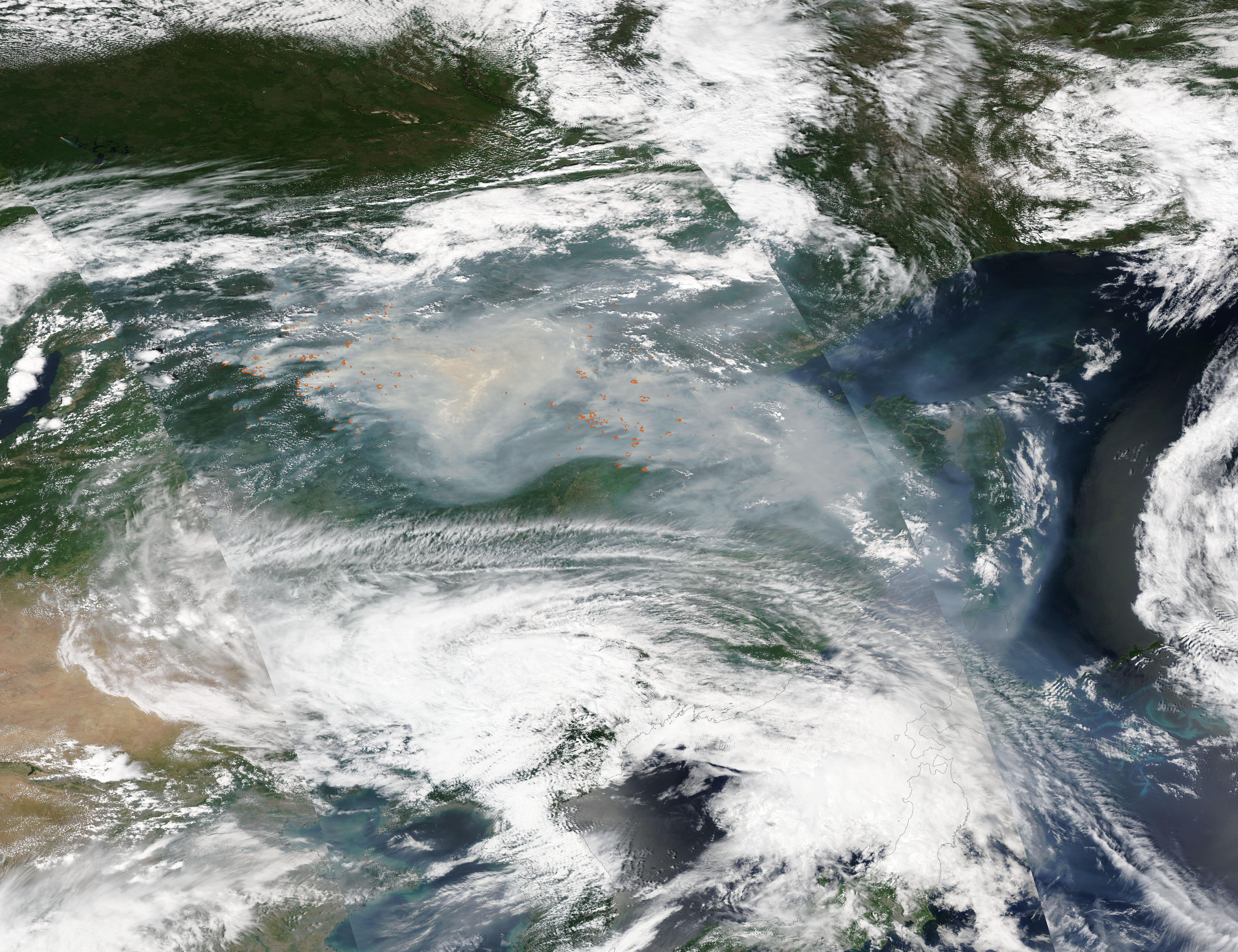
- Satellite imaging from NASA's Aqua satellite showing widespread wildfires and smoke in Russia's Far East, taken on July 3, 2024
- Date: March 2024 – summer 2024
- Location: Russian Far East and Southern Russia, primarily Amur Oblast, Sakha Republic, and Zabaykalsky Krai

Statistics
- Total fires: 6,000+ (6.8 megatons in carbon emissions)
- Total area: 8.8 million hectares (21.7 million acres)

Ignition
- Cause: Climate change-induced temperature increases, drier conditions, and drier soil.

In 2024, far-reaching wildfires ignited and spread across large areas of Russian territory, primarily in Siberia and also in southern regions. The wildfires resulted in a burnt area of 8.8 million hectares (21.7 million acres) by July 18, and carbon emissions of 6.8 megatons by July 1, equaling the combined June–July emissions of 2023 in just one month.

== Wildfires ==
Climate researchers and experts stated that increases in global temperature have led to the increased prevalence of wildfire conditions across Russian forests by causing increased heat, drier conditions, and decreased soil moisture.

Wildfires first began to prominently appear in March 2024, burning nearly 65,000 hectares across the Far East in Khabarovsk, Amur Oblast, Buryatia, Krasnoyarsk Krai, Sverdlovsk Oblast, Zabaykalsky Krai, and the Jewish Autonomous Oblast.

The Copernicus Atmosphere Monitoring Service (CAMS) first detected major wildfires in the Arctic regions of Russia in early June, and recorded "high carbon emissions in the Arctic Circle" as a result. CAMS detected exceptionally higher-than-average daily total fire radiative power values in the Amur Oblast, Sakha Republic, and Zabaykalsky Krai, which markedly increased at the beginning of July. In particular, the values in Amur Oblast had already reached the highest amount in the June–July period since the start of the dataset 22 years ago by July 15. By July 1, the estimated amount of carbon emissions from wildfires in Russia for June–July 2024 already matched the June–July emissions of 2023. CAMS also stated that by the last week of June, 6.8 megatons of carbon emissions had already been generated by wildfires, marking the third highest annual amount in Russia in the past 20 years exceeded only by the 2019 and 2020 wildfire seasons. Senior CAMS scientist Mark Parrington stated that: "the northeastern region of the Arctic had experienced the largest increase in extreme wildfires over the last two decades".

Russian officials stated that by June 24, 160 wildfires had already burnt nearly 460,000 hectares of land. Official Russian figures in mid-July stated that 6,000 wildfires had burned an area over 3.5 million hectares in size, meaning that while the number of wildfires was decreased by 30% from 2023, the burned area had increased by 50%.

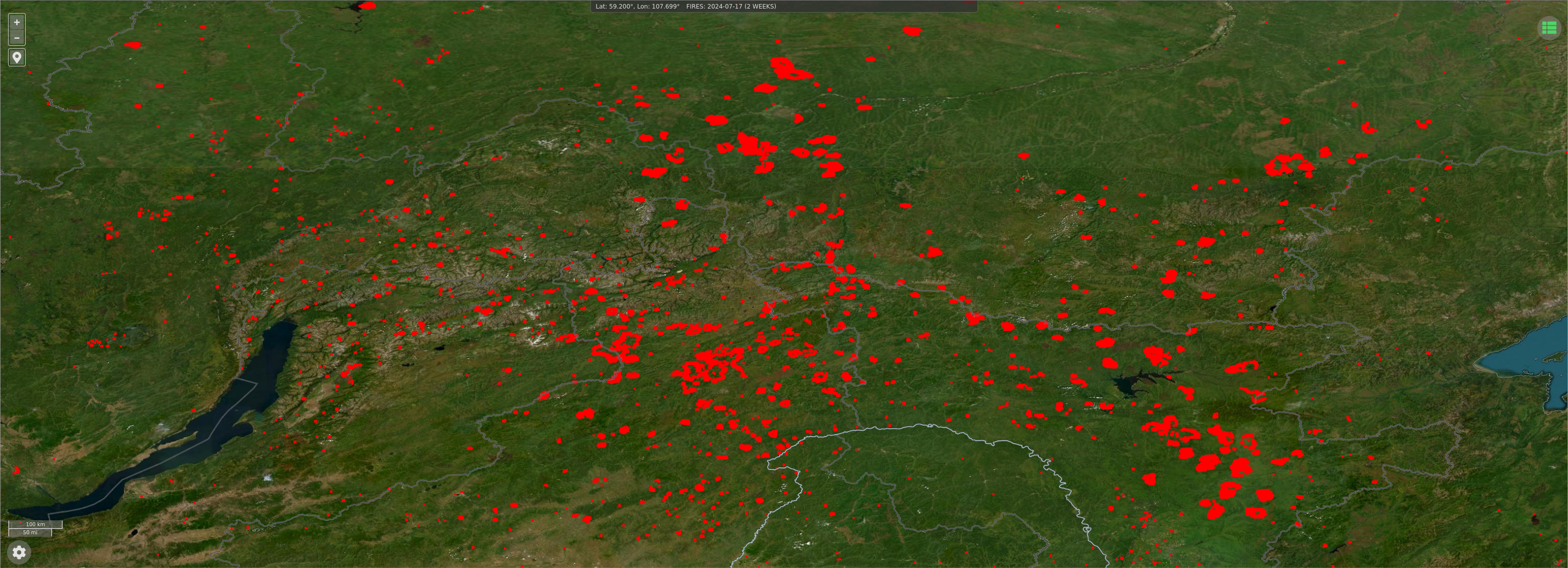
NASA's FIRMS showing 14 days of detected fires in Far East Russia on 2024-07-17

On July 18, the independent environmental organization Earth Touches Everyone reported that official wildfire data indicated that by July 17, 8.8 million hectares (21.7 million acres) across Russia burned due to widespread wildfires in 2024, and noted that 2024 was worse than the 2022 and 2023 wildfire seasons. The Russian Federal Forest Management Agency reported that 5,000 civilians were fighting 222 different wildfires across 20 different regions. Wildfires in the Sakha Republic destroyed an area of over 930 hectares and came within 10 kilometers (6.2 miles) of the village of Belaya Gora.

== Response ==
On July 14, Novorossiysk mayor Andrei Kravchenko declared an evacuation order and state of emergency for the city due to a wildfire that had already "impacted several recreation centers around the city". Buses and boats were used to evacuate civilians.

In mid-August, Tuva Republic authorities in southern Siberia issued an evacuation order for close to five hundred children away from summer camps located near 31 wildfires burning forests in the region that had burned 2,850 hectares (7,043 acres).

== See also ==
- 2020 Russian wildfires
- 2021 Russia wildfires
- 2022 Siberian wildfires
- Russian mystery fires (2022–present)
- 2025 Russian wildfires
