= 2010 Russian wildfires =

Series of natural disasters in Russia

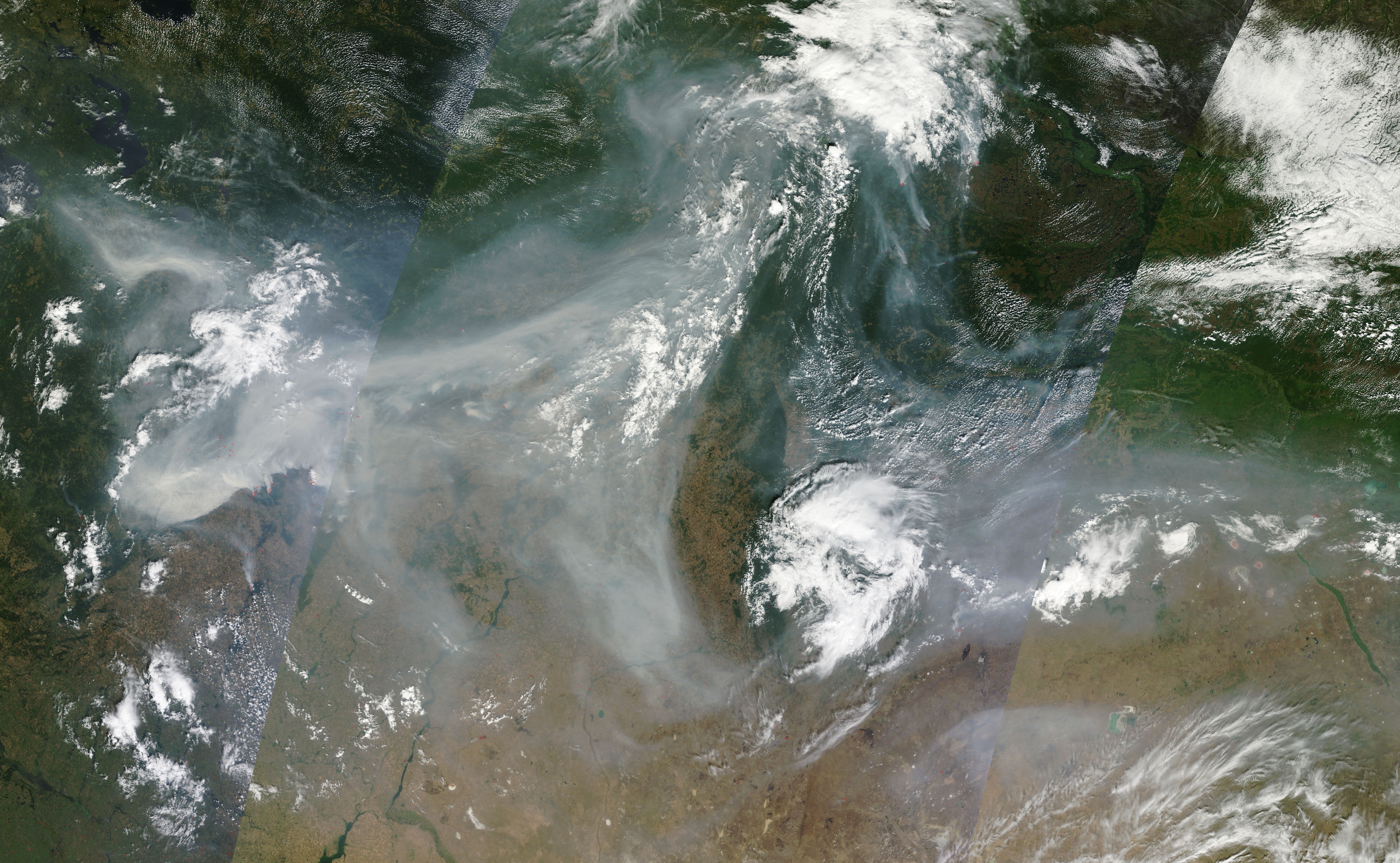
- Smoke over western Russia on 4 August 2010
- Date: late July 2010 – early September 2010
- Location: Russia

Statistics
- Burned area: 300,000 hectares (740,000 acres)
- Land use: villages, farmland, woodlands

Impacts
- Deaths: 54 in wildfires 55,736 in heat wave
- Structures destroyed: 2,000

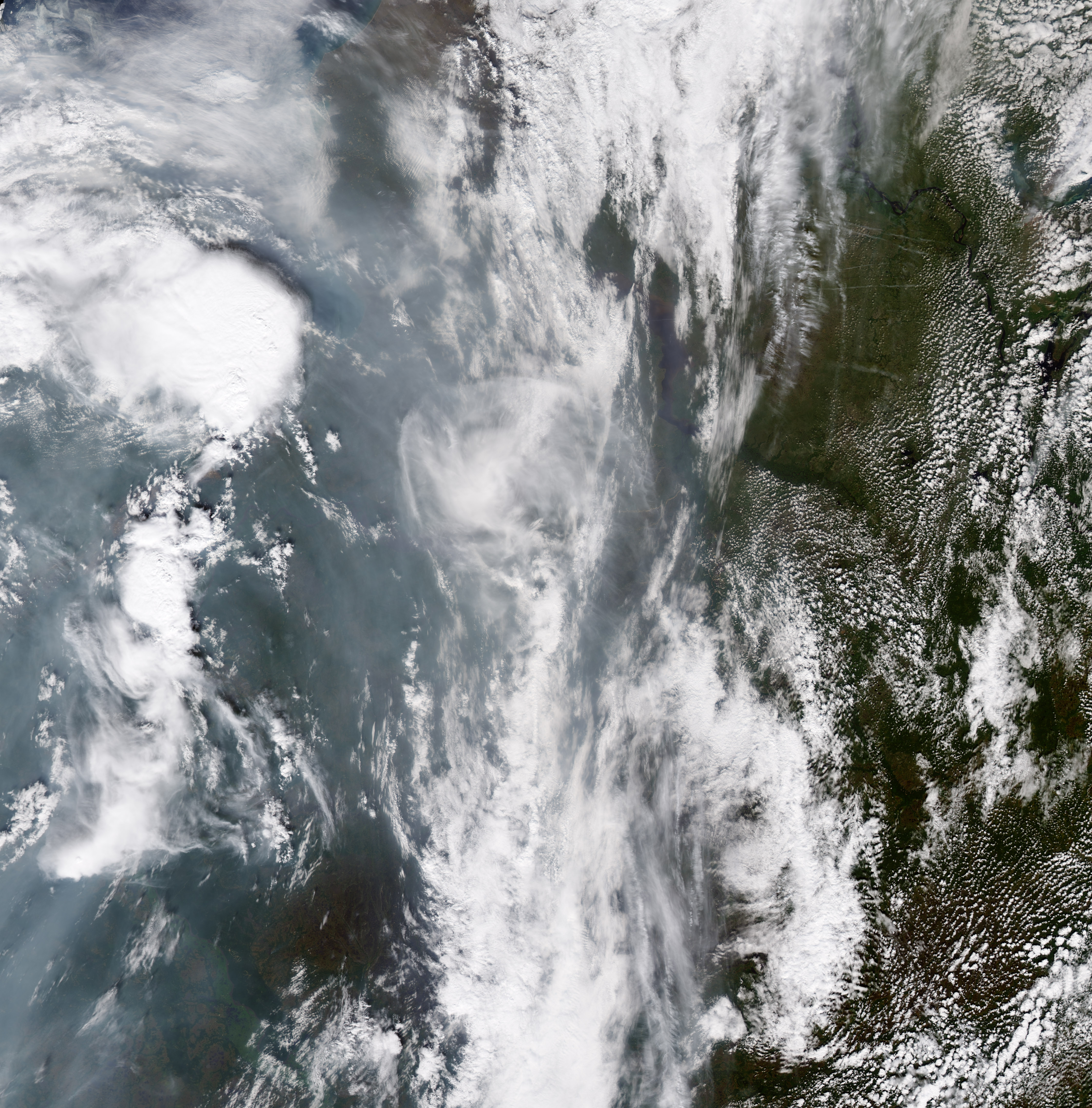
Pyrocumulonimbus cloud (circular cloud, left) caused by 1 August 2010 wildfires.

The 2010 Russian wildfires were several hundred wildfires that broke out across Russia, primarily in the west in summer 2010. They started burning in late July and lasted until early September 2010. The fires were associated with record-high temperatures, which were attributed to climate change—the summer had been the hottest recorded in Russian history—and drought.

Russian President Dmitry Medvedev declared a state of emergency in seven regions, and 28 other regions were under a state of emergency due to crop failures caused by the drought. The fires cost roughly $15 billion in damages.

A combination of the smoke from the fires, producing heavy smog blanketing large urban regions and the record-breaking heat wave put stress on the Russian healthcare system. Munich Re estimated that in all, 56,000 people died from the effects of the smog and the heat wave. The 2010 wildfires were the worst on record to that time.

== Prelude ==
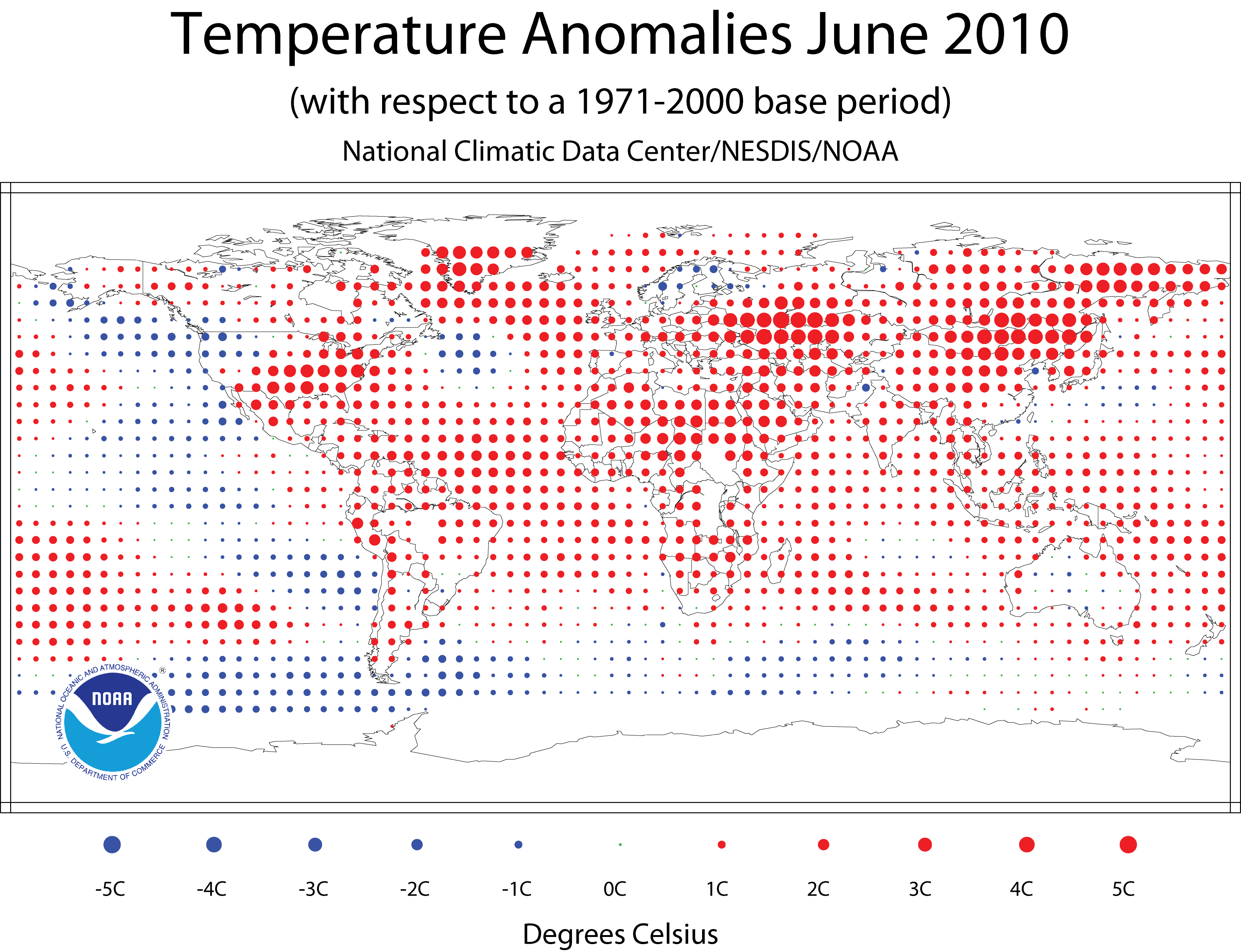
Global temperature anomalies in June 2010, showing a concentrated region of temperatures about 4–5 °C+ above average in Western Russia.

During 2010 Russia experienced dry, hot weather starting around late May and lasting until early June. Temperatures of 35 °C (95 °F) first occurred after 12 June, which alone was an abnormality for the country (average mid-June temperatures seldom rise above 30 °C (86 °F)). In late June, Russian regions such as the Eurasian Sakha Republic, as well as areas of partial taiga, had temperatures of 38–40 °C (100–104 °F). The warm ridging pattern then slowly moved westward to the Ural Mountains, and by July settled in European Russia.

On 25 June a new temperature record was set in the Asian portion of Russia, at Belogorsk, Amur Oblast, at 42.3 °C (108.1 °F). The previous record in the Asian portion was 41.7 °C (107.1 °F) at Aksha on 21 July 2004. A new record for the highest nationwide temperature in Russia was set on 11 July, at 44 °C (111 °F), in Yashkul, Kalmykia (in the European portion), beating the previous record of 43.8 °C (110.8 °F) set on 6 August 1940, in Kalmykia.

Average temperatures in the region increased to over 35 °C (95 °F). The mean high for European Russia recorded on 26 July reached 40 °C (104 °F) during the day. During July 2010, a large portion of European Russia was more than 7 °C (12.6 °F) warmer than normal.

According to the director of the Global Fire Monitoring Centre (GFMC) Johann Goldammer, the wildfires were caused by "negligent [human] behaviour", such as lighting barbecues and fireworks in a densely wooded area. Such human activity, coupled with the unusually high temperatures over the Russian territories, catalyzed this record disturbance.

== Timeline ==
=== 29 July ===
Peat fires causing significant loss of properties and an unverified number of human fatalities started in the Nizhny Novgorod Oblast, the Voronezh Oblast, Moscow Oblast, Ryazan Oblast and across central and western Russia due to unseasonably hot weather.

=== 31 July ===
Regions with wildfire spreading on 31 July.

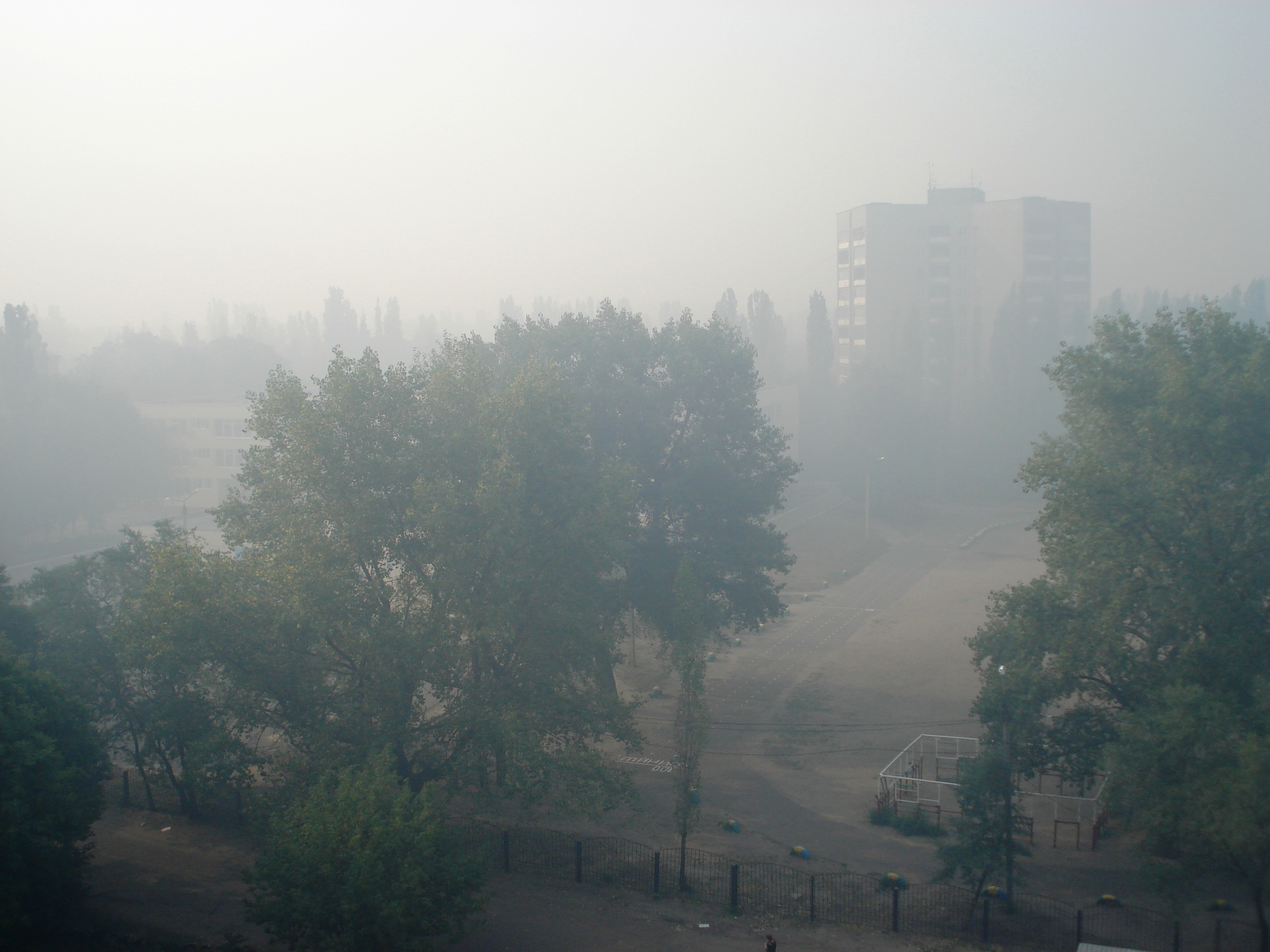
Smoke in Voronezh Oblast.

The head of EMERCOM, Sergey Shoygu, reported on 31 July 2010 that the fire situation in the seventeen federal subjects of Russia, especially in Vladimir and Moscow Oblasts, may be complicated. He claimed that in Nizhny Novgorod Oblast the velocity of fires was 100 meters per minute, and the fiery air flow tore trees from the root, like a hurricane. A YouTube video was uploaded, showing a group of men escaping from a burning village in Vyksa district by driving their car over a burning road.

=== 1 August ===
On 1 August 2010, the area of the forest fires was 114,000 ha (1,140 km^{2}). The Central Regional Center MOE Russia website reported that in Moscow Oblast 130 foci of natural fires were detected, covering the area of 880 hectares. Of those, 67 fires covered an area of 178 hectares.

=== 2 August ===
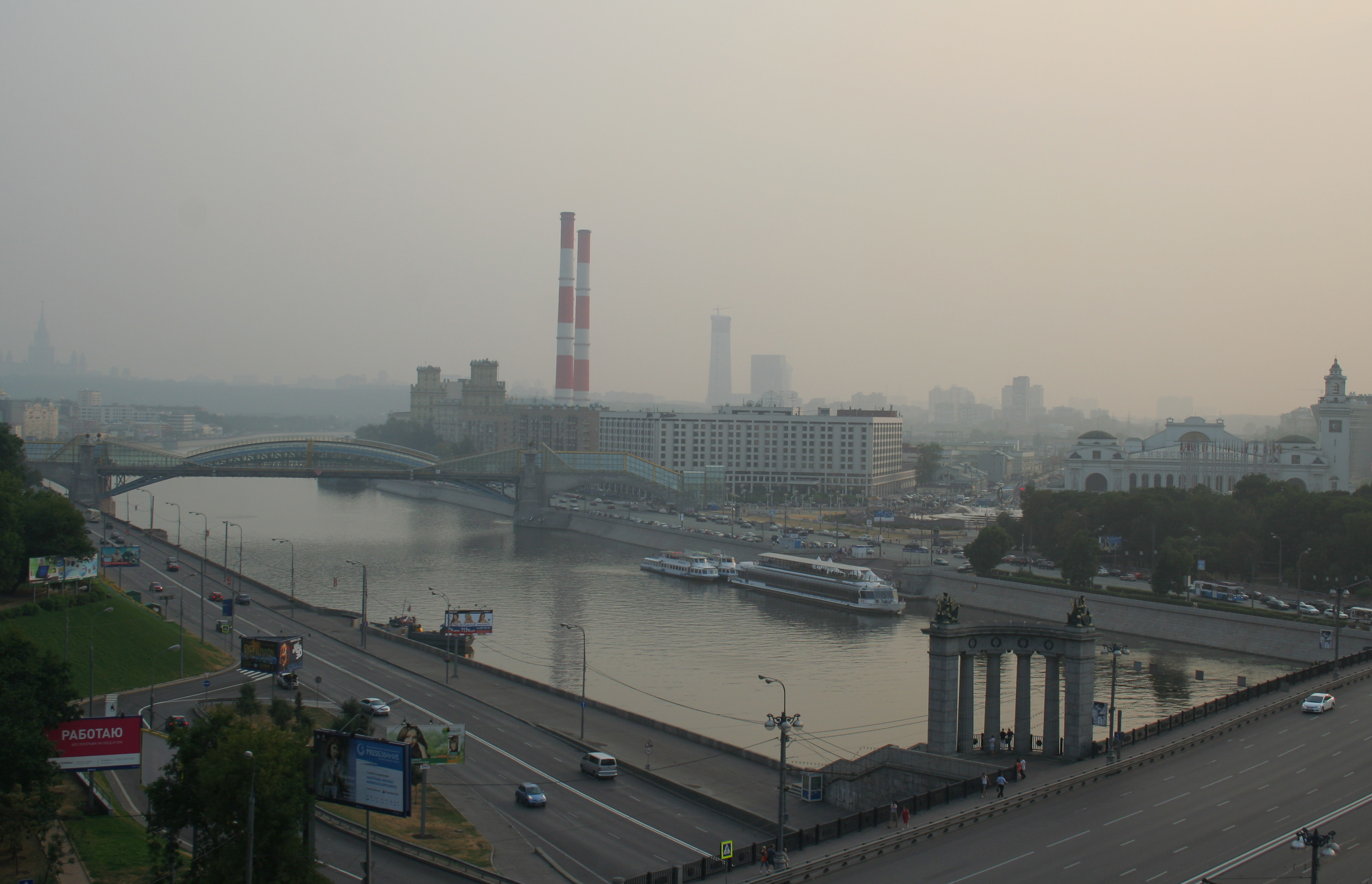
Smoke of the wildfires over Moscow.

According to "Interfax" referring to the head of the National Center for Crisis Management of EMERCOM Vladimir Stepanov, as of 2 August 2010, Russia revealed approximately 7,000 fires in the area over 500,000 ha (5,000 km^{2}). Fire was also burning in 14 federal subjects of Russia, and on 2 August 2010, officials reported the death of 34 people.

Moscow on Monday was covered in smoke, with reduced road visibility. On Monday, 2 August 2010, Vladimir Putin scheduled a meeting with the Governors of Voronezh, Novgorod, Samara, Moscow, Ryazan, and Vladimir Oblasts, as well as the Head of the Republic of Mordovia.

=== 4 August ===
By 4 August, the wildfires were still burning over 188,525 ha (1,885.25 km^{2}), with a death toll of at least 48. Some fires burned in areas near the nuclear research center in Sarov. However Rosatom head Sergey Kiriyenko dismissed apprehension of an atomic explosion.

President Dmitry Medvedev cut short his summer break to return to Moscow for an emergency meeting of the national security council to address the crisis. At an international meeting on 30 July, amid the ongoing heat wave and wildfires, Medvedev announced on television that "practically everything is burning. The weather is anomalously hot. What's happening with the planet's climate right now needs to be a wake-up call to all of us, meaning all heads of state, all heads of social organizations, in order to take a more energetic approach to countering the global changes to the climate."

Medvedev sacked some of his senior navy officers after one fire destroyed Russian navy equipment. The officers were accused of "incomplete professional responsibility" after several buildings were allowed to burn down and vehicles and equipment destroyed. He suggested anyone who had neglected their duties would be prosecuted. On the same day it was reported that another fire was approaching a major secret nuclear research facility in the city of Sarov.

Environmental groups, such as the WWF, and "non-systemic" opposition politicians suggested firefighting has been slowed down by the Forest Code law passed by the Duma in 2006 at the order of Putin. The legislation transferred responsibility for the country's vast woodlands to regional authorities, putting 70,000 forestry guards out of work.

=== 5 August ===
According to the Emergencies Ministry, there were 843 reported outbreaks of fires, including 47 peat fires. There were 73 large fires. The fires threatened an animal sanctuary for over 1,800 animals, including dogs and retired circus animals. Almost 600 fires were still burning in the country, and around 2,000 homes had been destroyed. The President fired several high-ranking military officials after fires burned through a secret military base.

Carbon monoxide pollution in Moscow was four times above normal. Firefighters fought to prevent the wildfires from reaching Bryansk, an area bordering Ukraine contaminated with radioactive material, including cesium-137 and strontium-90, in the soils following the 1986 Chernobyl disaster. Emergencies Minister Sergey Shoygu warned that fires could release radionuclides into the air. He said that a new zone of radioactive pollution could emerge. Two fires broke out in the region but were contained.

=== 6 August ===
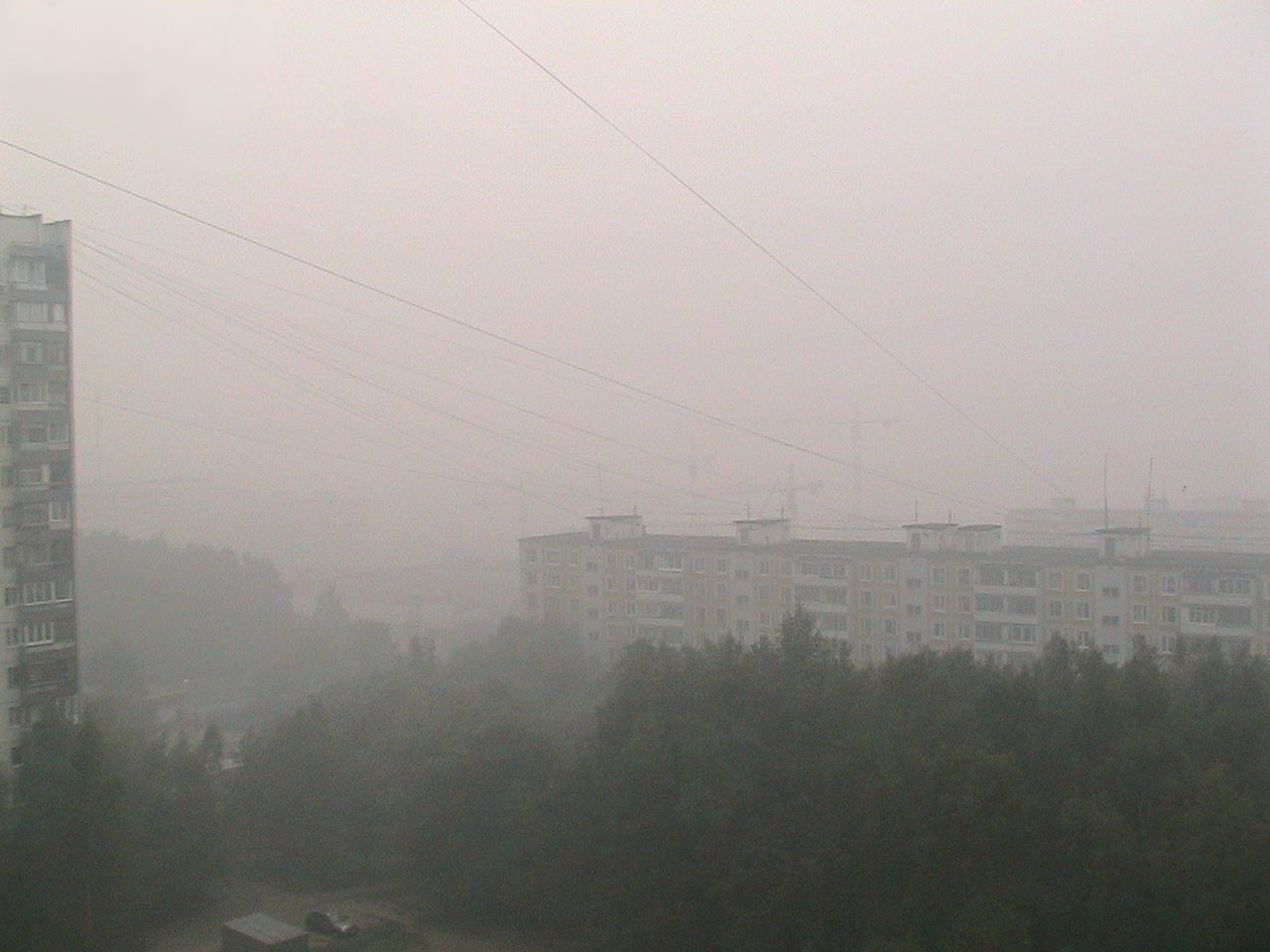
Smoke in Moscow on 6 August 2010

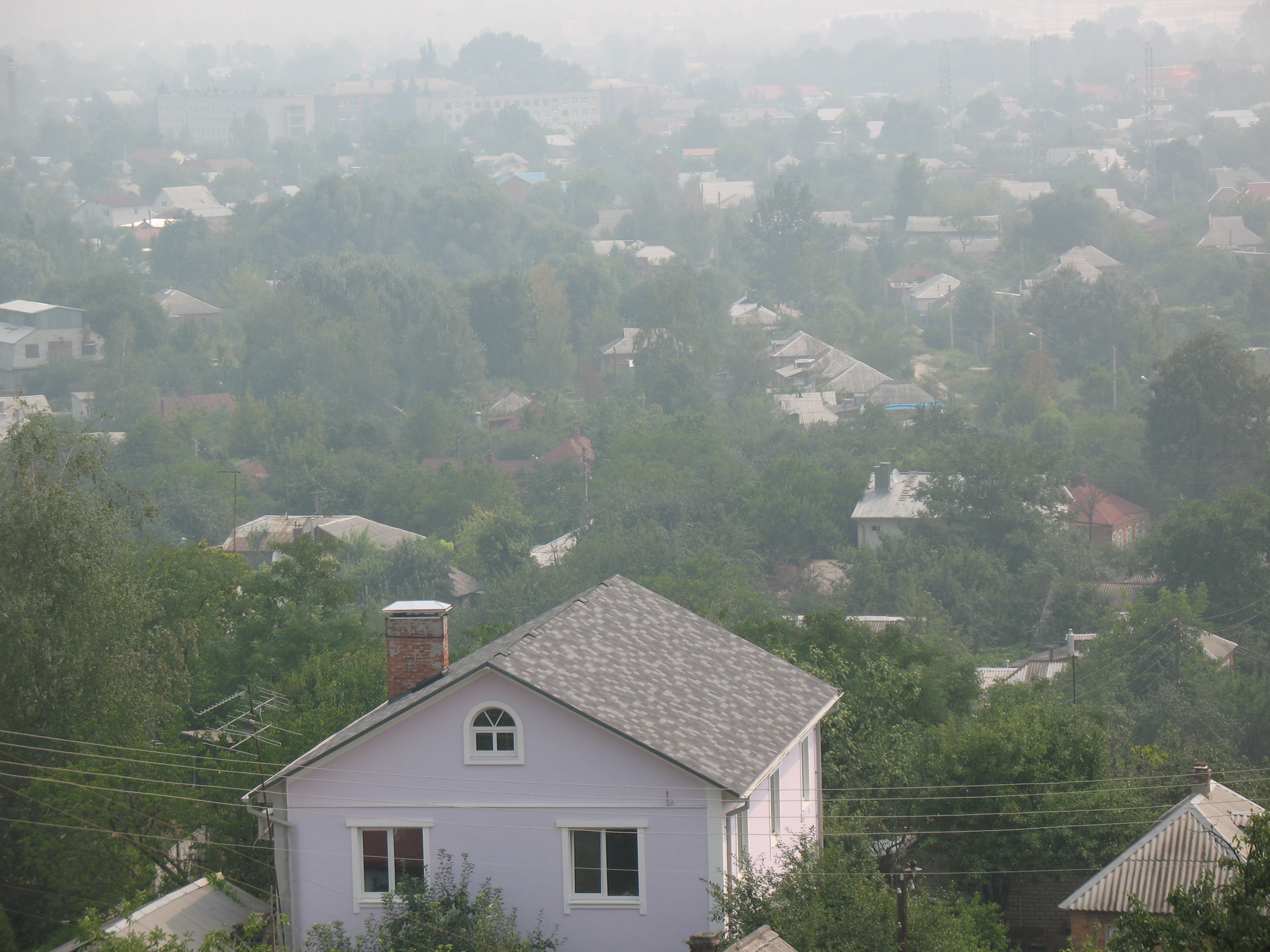
Smoke in Kharkiv, Ukraine on 14 August

According to the Emergencies Ministry, there were registered 831 fires, including 42 peat fires. 80 large fires were registered in an area of 150,800 ha (1,508 km^{2}). Almost 162,000 people were reported to be fighting with the flames in the regions of Moscow, Voronezh, Nizhny Novgorod, Ryazan, Ivanovo, Vladimir, Yaroslavl, Tver, Yekaterinburg, Republic of Mordovia, and Mari El Republic.

According to the State environmental agency "Mosekomonitoring", in the morning in Moscow, the maximum concentration of carbon monoxide in the air exceeded the acceptable norm by 3.6 times, the content of suspended particles by 2.8 times, and specific hydrocarbons by 1.5 times. The Moscow airports of Domodedovo and Vnukovo were unable to land more than 40 planes and were only able to send about 20 planes due to the strong haze caused by the smoke. As of 10 a.m., visibility at Domodedovo was 350 m and 300 m at Vnukovo. According to the Federal Air Transportation Agency, the Sheremetyevo airport works as usual because of visibility of about 800 m.

An international football friendly match (Russia–Bulgaria) scheduled for 11 August was moved to Saint Petersburg. Two Russian Premier League football games were postponed because of the severe environmental situation.

According to the spectrometric data received from the NASA satellites Terra and Aqua, the smoke from the fires in some places rose to a height of about 12 kilometers and ended up in the stratosphere, which usually only occurs during volcanic eruptions. Satellite imagery showed that a cloud of smoke 1,850 mi (2,980 km) wide covered Western Russia.

=== 7 August ===
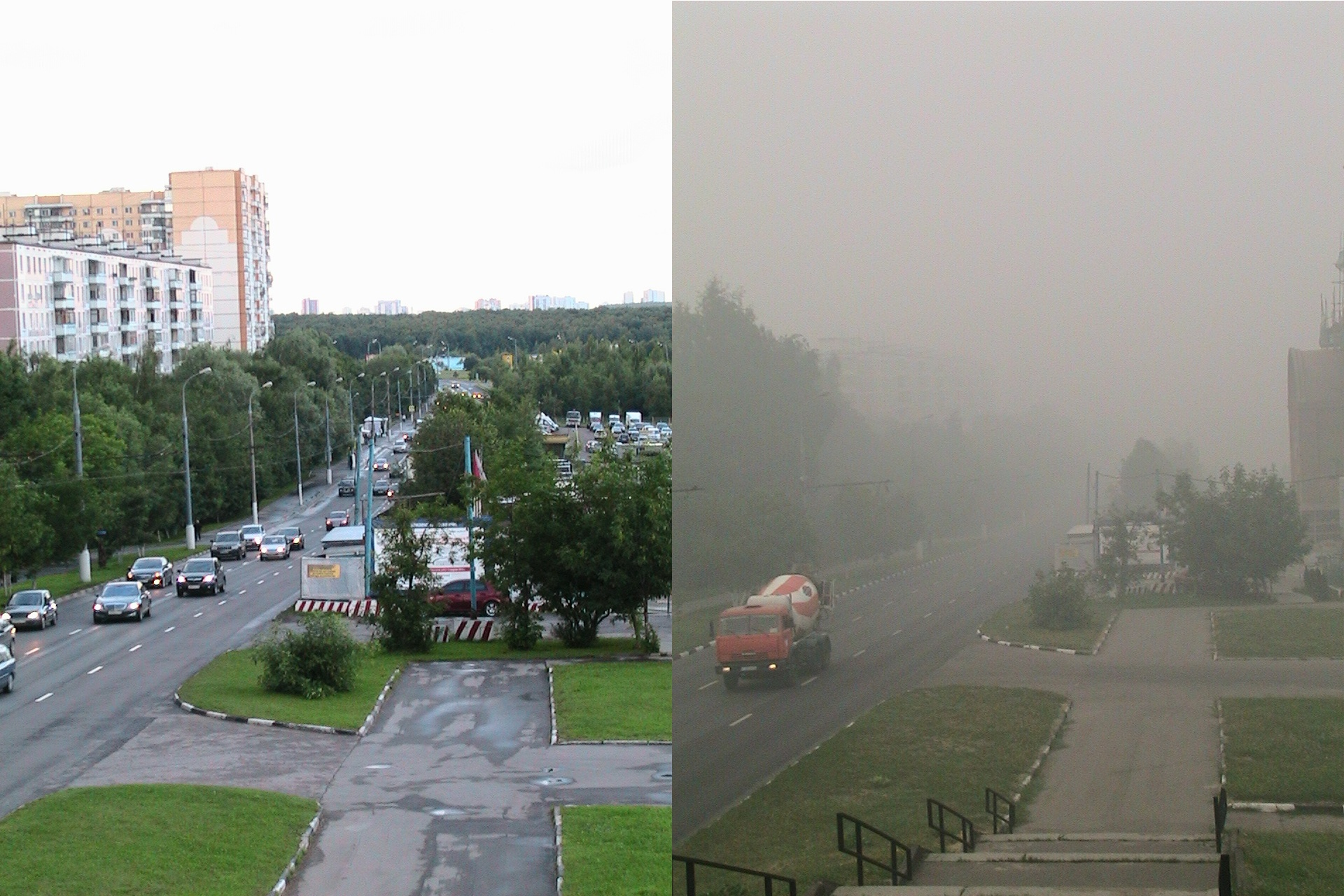
Moscow, Yasenevo, Aivazovskogo street. Left – 17 June 2010, 20:22. Right – 7 August 2010, 17:05.

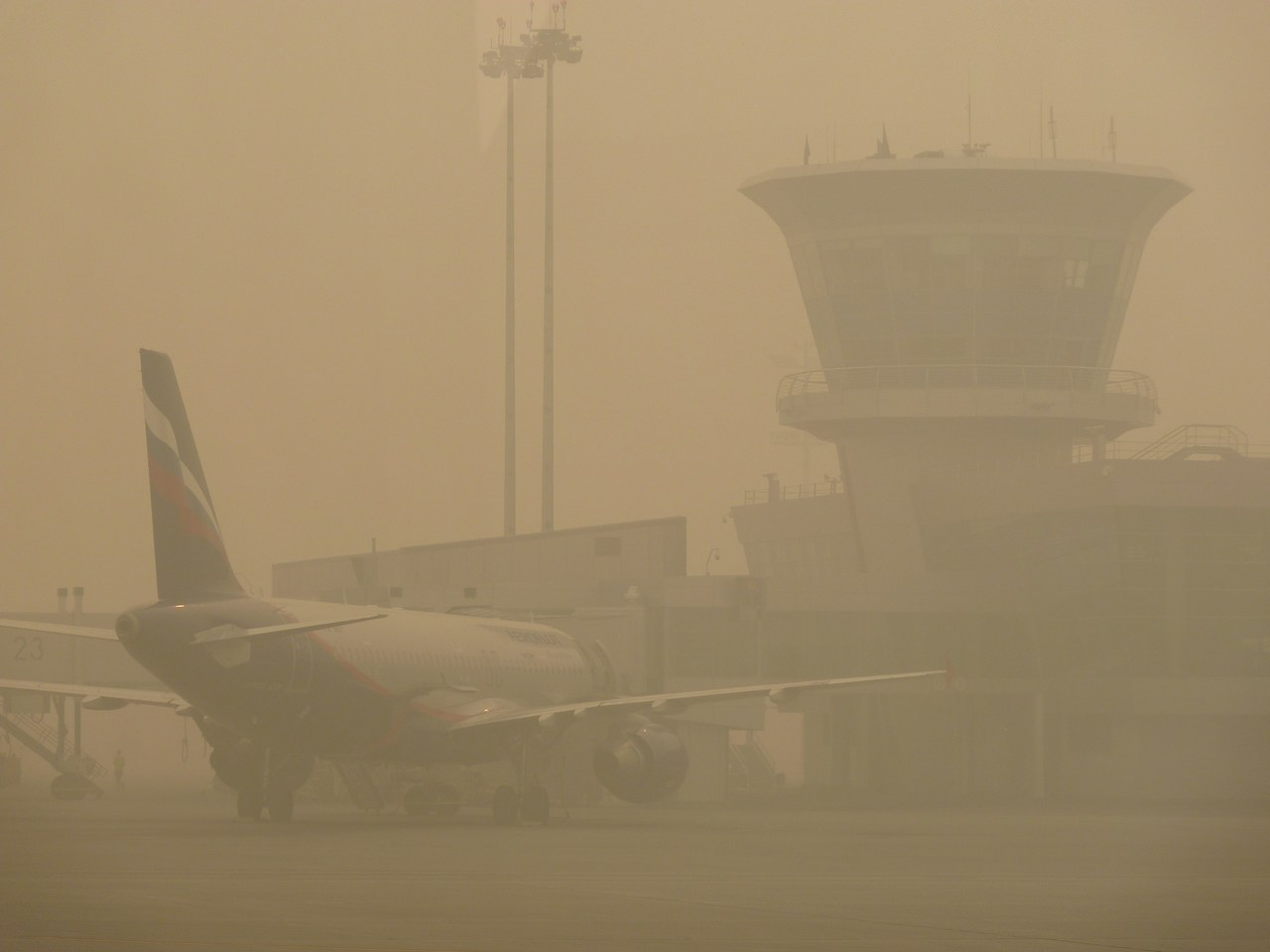
Smoke in Sheremetyevo 7 August 2010.

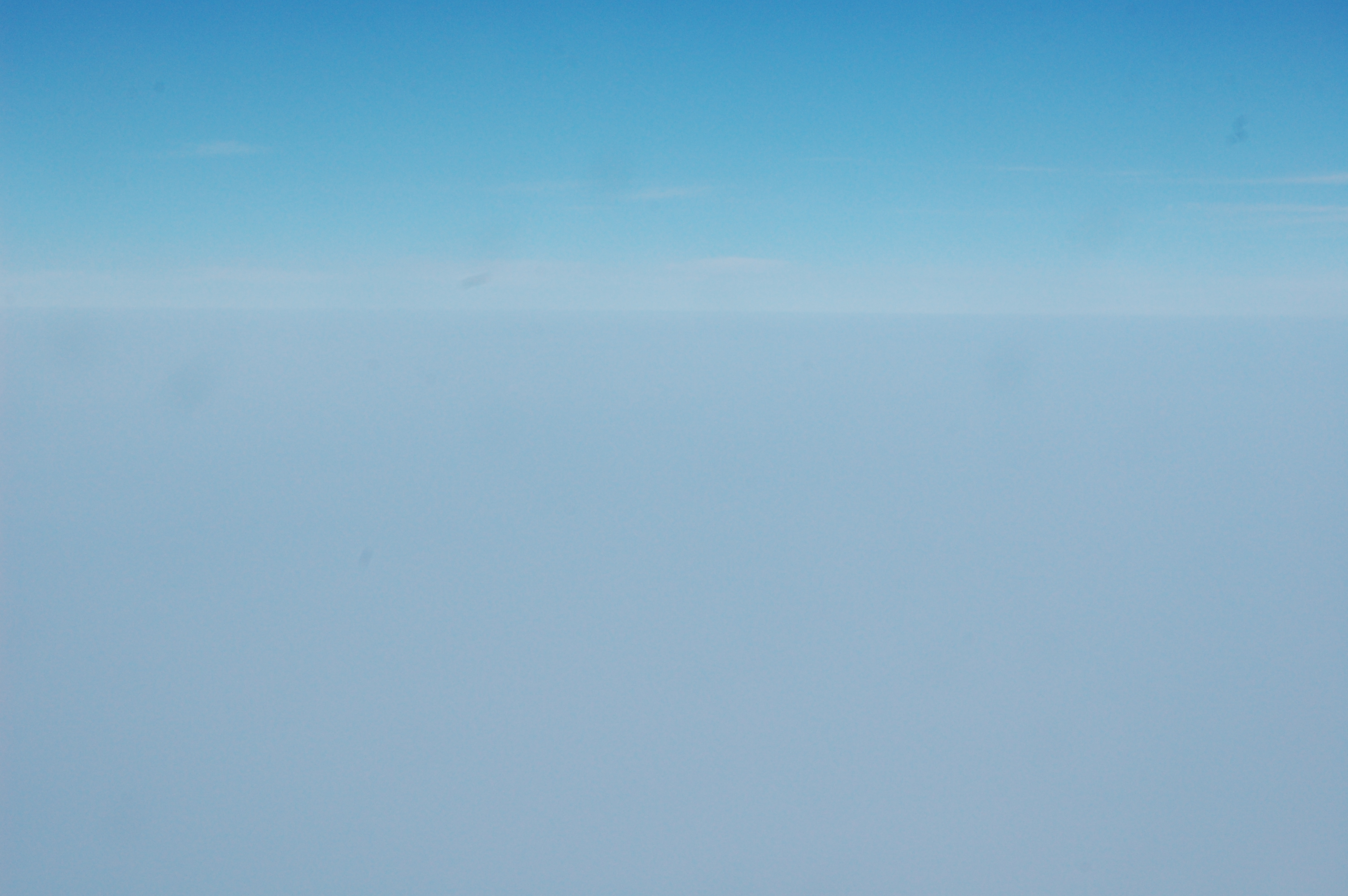
The upper border of the smoke layer (7–8 km) above the Moscow region.

Emergency officials registered 853 outbreaks of fire by 7 August, including 32 peat fires, with a total area of 193,516 ha (1,935.16 km^{2}), in which 244 islands of fire were put out, and 290 new fires sprung up.

In Moscow, by noon the concentration of airborne pollutants intensified and reached at 6.6 times normal level for carbon monoxide, and 2.2 times for suspended particulate matter. Seven flights heading for Domodedovo and Vnukovo airports were redirected to alternative airfields. The temperature may have reached 40 °C (104 °F) in Moscow Oblast. At Sheremetyevo International Airport, visibility was reduced to 325 meters.

=== 8 August ===
Smoke from fires in the Novgorod region travel north, arriving in Saint Petersburg.

=== 10 August ===
Early in the afternoon of 10 August Greenpeace Russia stated that fires were raging in radioactive polluted areas near Bryansk, which had previously been impacted by the Chernobyl disaster of 1986. This area is still heavily contaminated and has no inhabitants. In the Moscow area a heavy thunderstorm broke over the city. NO_{2} rates decreased by 8 times, returning to their usual levels. However, temperatures over 35 degrees Celsius persist. Experts stated that the polluted air would resume within a few days. Environmental scientists stated that the brown cloud produced by the fires may cause soot to land on Arctic sea ice, causing faster melting. The release of industrial polychlorinated biphenyls from the fires and cryoconite causing melting on the Greenland Ice Sheet were also concerns.

=== 12 August ===
With the number of fires being reduced from 612 to 562, the skies over Moscow were mostly clear on 12 August. Residents in the city told reporters that they were overjoyed with the suddenly improved air; most of whom stopped wearing their masks as the air was safe to breathe. However, forecasts indicated that a shift in the winds was likely to occur in the coming days, likely bringing the smog back into Moscow. Reports indicated that roughly 80,000 hectares of land were still burning.

Press reports stated that a preliminary estimate of damage to the Russian economy as a result of the fires was €11.4 billion ($15 billion).

=== 13 August ===
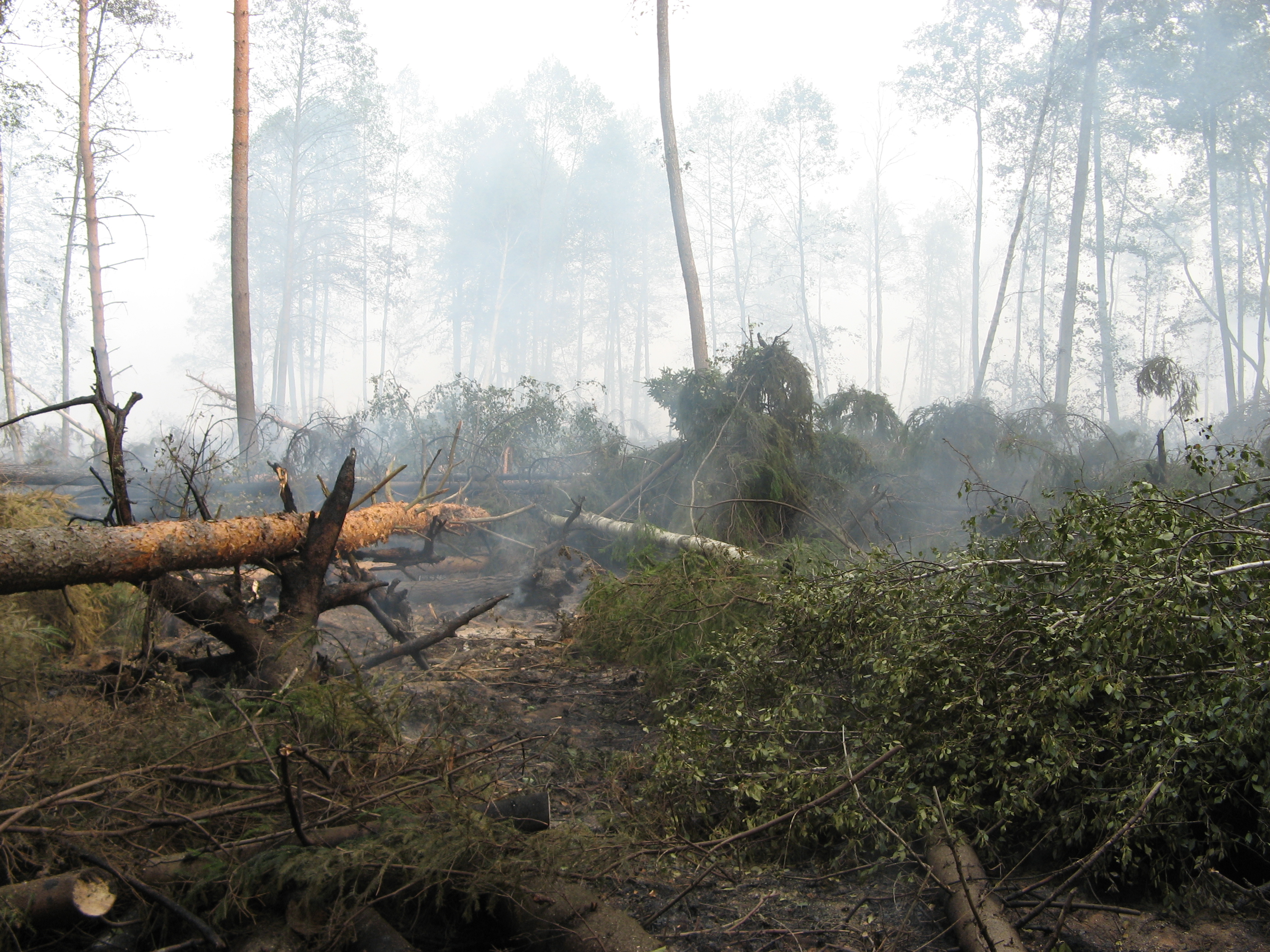
Front end of forest forest-peat fire fighting near Roshal town (Shatursky District) on 13 August 2010.

After weeks without rain, heavy downpours soaked Moscow and nearby areas. However, in Sarov, about 480 kilometres (300 mi) east of Moscow, a new fire started near the country's top nuclear research center. Earlier in August, radioactive and explosive materials were moved out of the facility due to the threat of fires; however, they were later returned when the threat lessened. Over 3,400 firefighters were battling the blaze and were being assisted by a special firefighting train.

=== 2 September ===
A new wave of wildfires flared up in Russia in September, killing at least 8 people and destroying nearly 900 buildings.

== Public health effects ==
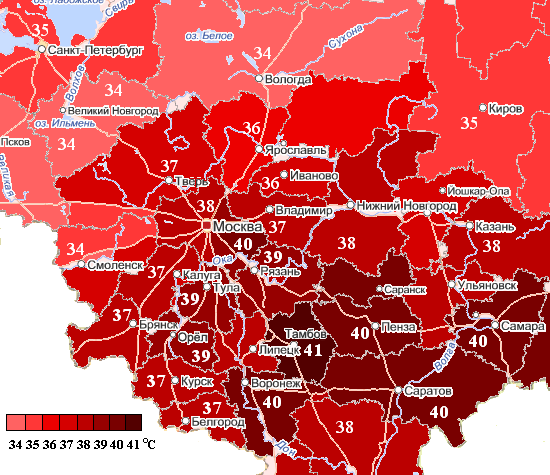
Temperatures on 31 July 2010.

Deaths in Moscow averaged 700 a day, about twice the usual number. The heat wave is believed to have been unprecedented in Russian history, and killed 55,736 people, according to the Centre for Research on the Epidemiology of Disasters.

Fires have affected areas contaminated by the Chernobyl incident, specifically the surroundings of Bryansk and border regions with Belarus and Ukraine. Due to this, soil and plant particles contaminated by radioactive material could be released into the air and spread over wider areas. The Russian government indicated that there had been no discernible increase in radiation, even though Greenpeace accuses the government of denial. France's Institut de radioprotection et de sûreté nucléaire (Radioprotection and Nuclear Safety Institute) issued its own analysis on 12 August, and concluded that there was no health risk at the time, but that marginally elevated levels of radiation may be detected in the future.

== International assistance and response ==
Russia received assistance in extinguishing the fires from China, Serbia, Italy, Ukraine, Belarus, Armenia, Kazakhstan, Azerbaijan, Bulgaria, Poland, Lithuania, Iran, Estonia, Uzbekistan, Venezuela, France, Germany, Latvia and Finland

Many diplomats and a number of embassies temporarily closed, among them those of Austria, Canada, Germany, Poland and Norway. On its website, the United States Department of State advised Americans traveling to Moscow and surrounding areas should "carefully consider" their plans because of "hazardous levels of air pollution" and "numerous flight delays". Italy's Foreign Ministry advised people to "postpone any travel plans to Moscow that aren't strictly necessary".

== Volunteer efforts ==
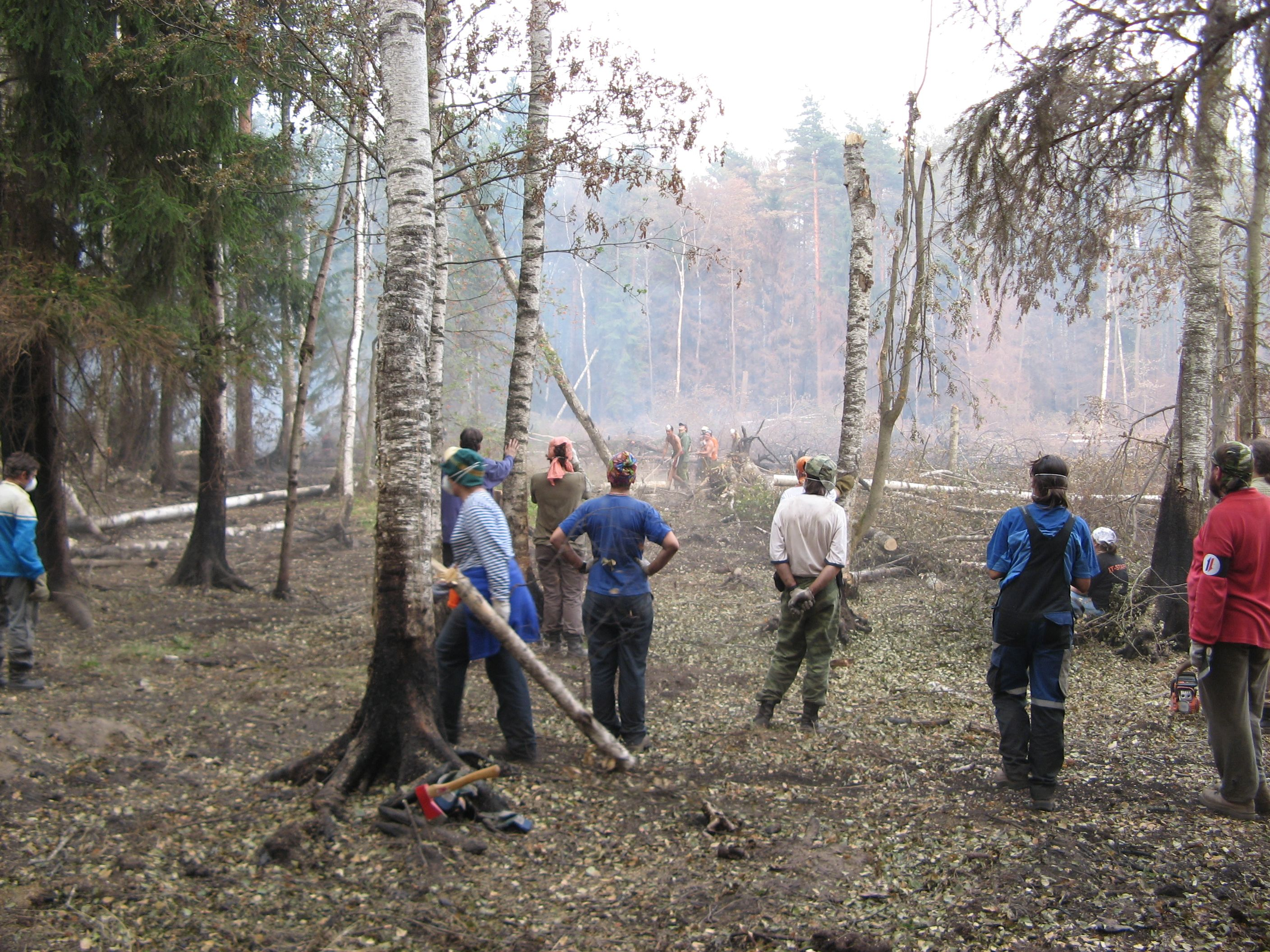
Volunteers near the town of Roshal (Shatursky District on 14 August 2010 sawed through burnt forest, cleared debris and extinguished small fires.

Volunteers took part in firefighting and helping those affected by the fires. In some cases, informal help was faster and more effective than official help. Volunteers bought and transported fire suppression materials, chainsaws, engine-driven water pumps, respirators, food, soap, and drinking water. Volunteer coordination happened via LiveJournal communities, the main one being pozar_ru. There is also a website Russian-fires.ru working on Ushahidi platform that was used at Haiti and Chile earthquakes to coordinate volunteers.

The Moscow Times wrote on 17 August 2010:

Volunteers, widely snubbed by professional firefighters because of their lack of experience, have saved several villages by using basic shovels and buckets of water and sand. Even after a larger fire is suppressed with a fire hose, the underbrush often continues to burn, and a gust of wind can ignite it into a blaze once again. Using shovels and water backpacks, volunteers in Yuvino isolated burning groundcover, cleared a fire line around the village, and loaned firefighters a pump to fill their trucks.

=== Volunteer casualties ===
One volunteer died in action in the Lukhovitsy District on 29 July 2010; the body was found on 15 August 2010. Another volunteer died in Mordovia from carbon monoxide poisoning on 4 August 2010; the body was found by Police patrol days later. Another volunteer died in a car crash in the Shatursky District on 14 August 2010.

== Censorship ==
Local Russian commercial and governmental mass media did not provide real-time information for the general public. In the case of a fast-moving wildfire there would be no chance to inform people via mass media about emergency evacuation. Furthermore, there was no official of Medvedev's administration personally responsible for providing emergency information of this kind.

In a piece under his byline on the Moscow Times website, "Right Cause" party co-founder Georgy Bovt wrote:

State-controlled television revealed as little information as possible to the public about the fires and smog. Its primary goal was to prevent panic. This eerily reminded me of how the Soviet government reacted to the Chernobyl explosion in April 1986. In a similar manner, the authorities withheld information about the extent of the nuclear fallout to "avoid panic".

In some cases, no information about villages affected by wildfire was available for two weeks. Doctors from several medical institutions in Moscow, interviewed by an Interfax correspondent, acknowledged that medical professionals were now forbidden to make a diagnosis of "thermal shock".

According to a Vedomosti poll on information about the fires in the newspapers, 68% of people said that they trusted online media such as blogs, 28% independent media, and only 4% government media.

Government Radio Mayak broadcast on 13 August:

Vice-minister of Ministry of Emergency Situations Alexander Chupriyan said on Friday (13 August 2010) that the peat fires were extinguished completely in the Noginsk, Kolomna, Pavlovsky Posad and Orekhovo-Zuyevo areas near Moscow.

A volunteer wrote about the same events on 13 August 2010 in the Orekhovo-Zuyevo area in his blog:

I have never seen such...Along the roads—the burned forest. Here and there still smoldering, smoking. The road blocks smoke. What you saw in Moscow — it is nothing you have seen.

Independent radio РСН on 14 August:

The MOE said that nothing is burning...TV show that nothing is burning...Civilians forced to buy fire equipment for firemen ... I saw open fire at Orekhovo-Zuyevo area.

Another volunteer wrote about the events on 15 August 2010 in the same Orekhovo-Zuyevo area in his blog:

The situation in Orekhovo is stable, i.e. a stable grassroots fire.

== Russian policies ==
The swamps and bogs surrounding Moscow had been drained in the 1960s for agricultural use and mining of peat to generate energy. In 2002, a series of hard-to-extinguish peat fires led the government to recognize that the peat fields needed to be re-watered to prevent wildfires. By 2010, however, large expanses of peat areas had not been rewatered and were kindling wildfires.

Government officials said they could not have anticipated the heatwave, but critics blamed complacent officials for ignoring warnings of blazes near villages. Sergey Robaten, Vadim Tatur, and Maksim Kalashnikov argued that the fires and the inability to contain and extinguish them was due to "the inaction of bureaucrats" and Putin's changing of how the Russian State Fire Service functions in 2001. Putin had transferred responsibility for fighting fires to those renting state property and the subjects of the federation, with the assumption that owners or renters would invest in whatever was necessary to prevent forest fires. However, the reality was more complex; Russian companies were seeking to turn a quick profit and thus neglected forest firefighting. Putin's spokesman remarked, "this is a well-functioning system which only needs some minor adjustments".

== See also ==
- Similar disasters
  - List of wildfires
  - 2012 Krasnodar Krai floods
  - 2010 Bolivia forest fires
  - 2010 China drought and dust storms
  - 2010 Pakistan floods
  - 2010 China floods
  - 2003 European heat wave
  - 1997 Southeast Asian haze
- Weather and climate
  - Climate of Russia
  - Weather of 2010
  - Siberian High
