= Heat wave =

Prolonged period of excessively hot weather

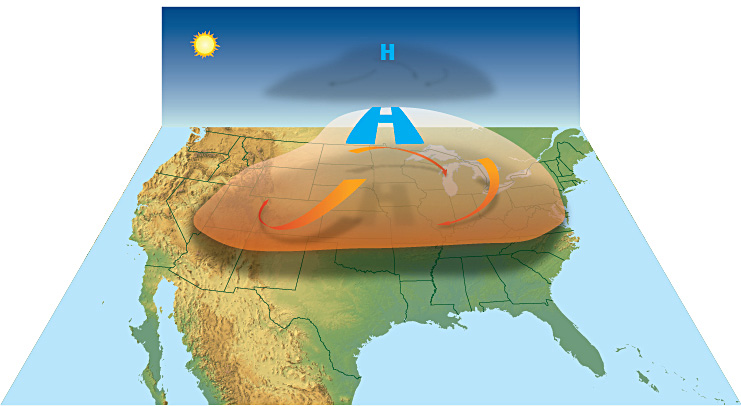
A high pressure system in the upper atmosphere traps heat near the ground, forming a heat wave (for North America in this example)

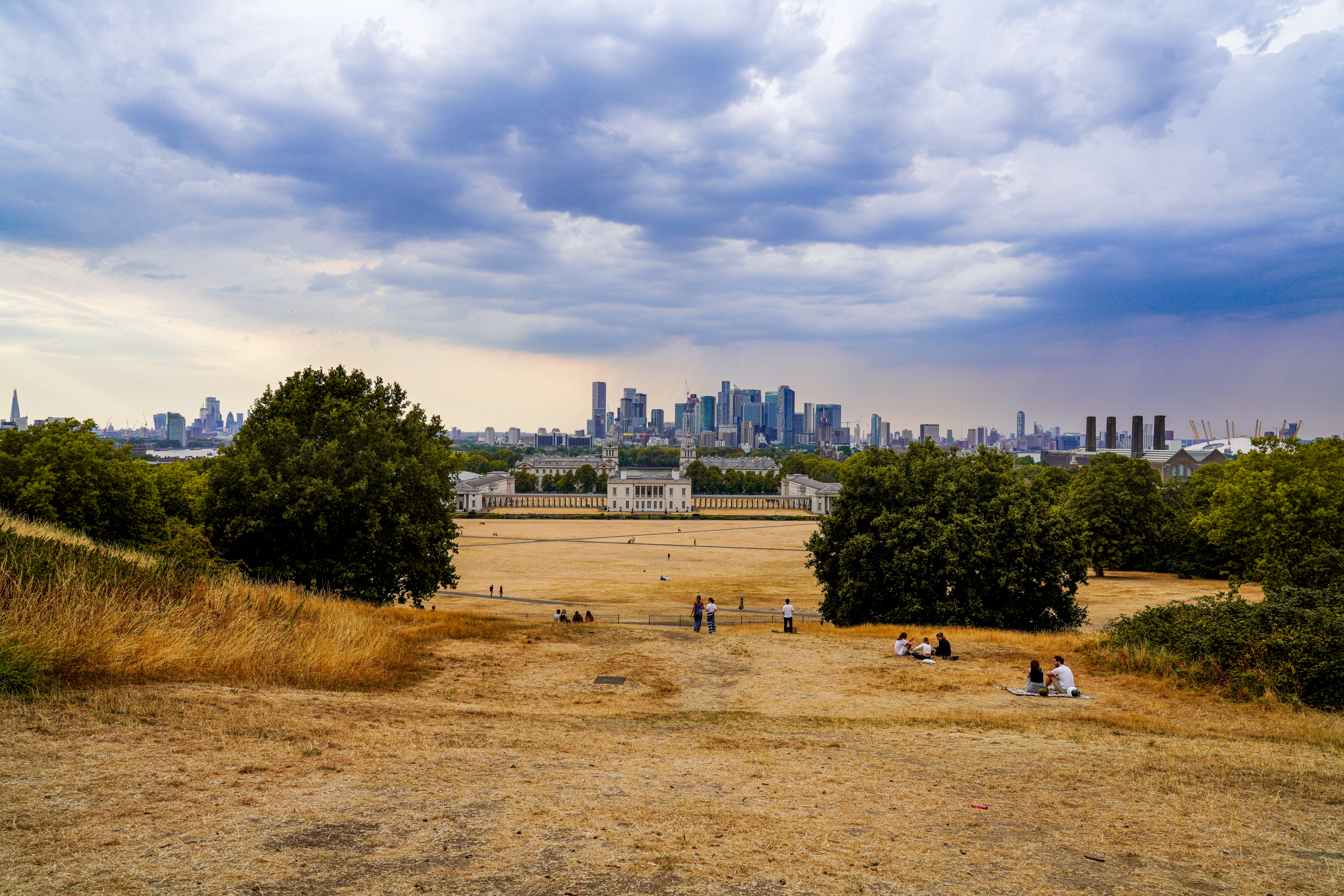
Scorched grass in Greenwich Park, London, England, during a heatwave in August 2022

A heat wave or heatwave, sometimes described as extreme heat, is a period of abnormally hot weather that lasts for multiple days. A heat wave is usually measured relative to the usual climate in the area and to normal temperatures for the season. The main difficulties with this broad definition emerge when one must quantify what the 'normal' temperature state is, and what the spatial extent of the event may or must be. Temperatures that humans from a hotter climate consider normal can be regarded as a heat wave in a cooler area. This would be the case if the warm temperatures are outside the normal climate pattern for that area.

Heat waves have become more frequent, and more intense over land, across almost every area on Earth since the 1950s, the increase in frequency and duration being caused by climate change. According to the World Meteorological Organization, heat waves continued to intensify in 2024, with record-breaking temperatures reported in Europe, North America, and China. Many regions experienced consecutive days above 45 °C (113 °F), highlighting the increasing frequency and severity of extreme heat events worldwide.

Heat waves form when a high-pressure area in the upper atmosphere strengthens and remains over a region for several days up to several weeks. This traps heat near the earth's surface. It is usually possible to forecast heat waves, thus allowing the authorities to issue a warning in advance.

Heat waves have an impact on the economy. They can reduce labour productivity, disrupt agricultural and industrial processes and damage infrastructure. Severe heat waves have caused catastrophic crop failures and thousands of deaths from hyperthermia. They have increased the risk of wildfires in areas with drought. They can put additional stress on electrical grids, potentially causing power outages (blackouts or brownouts). A heat wave counts as extreme weather. It poses a danger to human health, because heat and sunlight overwhelm thermoregulation in humans.

== Definitions ==
There are several definitions of heat waves:

- The IPCC defines a heatwave as "a period of abnormally hot weather, often defined with reference to a relative temperature threshold, lasting from two days to months."
- A definition based on the Heat Wave Duration Index is that a heat wave occurs when the daily maximum temperature of more than five consecutive days exceeds the average maximum temperature by 5 °C (9 °F), the normal period being 1961–1990. The same definition is used by the WMO.
- A definition from the Glossary of Meteorology is: "A period of abnormally and uncomfortably hot and usually humid weather."
- Marine heatwaves are generally described as prolonged discrete periods of unusually warm sea surface temperatures in a specific region. At this time the most commonly accepted definition is that proposed by Hobday et al. which refers to an algorithm that uses percentile values for temperatures, and defines a threshold set as the 90th percentile for a given day of the year, above which one can say a marine heatwave is occurring. This definition can be used with temperature data acquired anywhere in the world, allowing for comparisons across different observations and latitudes.

=== Definitions by country ===
==== Asia ====
In Singapore, a heat wave is defined as occurring when the average daily maximum temperature is at least 35 °C (95.0 °F) for three consecutive days, and the average daily mean temperature throughout the period is at least 29 °C (84.2 °F).

==== Europe ====
Denmark defines a national heat wave (hedebølge) as a period of at least 3 consecutive days in which the average maximum temperature across more than half the country exceeds 28 °C (82.4 °F). The Danish Meteorological Institute also has a definition for a "warmth wave" (varmebølge). It defines this using the same criteria for a 25 °C (77.0 °F) temperature. Sweden defines a heat wave as at least five days in a row with a daily high exceeding 25 °C (77.0 °F).

In Greece, the Hellenic National Meteorological Service defines a heat wave as occurring over three consecutive days with temperatures at 39 °C (102 °F) or higher. In the same period the minimum temperature is 26 °C (79 °F) or more. During this period, there are either no winds or only weak winds. These conditions occur in a broad area.

The Netherlands defines a heat wave as a period of at least five consecutive days in which the maximum temperature in De Bilt exceeds 25 °C (77 °F). During this period the maximum temperature in De Bilt must exceed 30 °C (86 °F) for at least three days. Belgium also uses this definition of a heat wave with Ukkel as a reference point. So does Luxembourg.

In the United Kingdom, the Met Office operates a Heat Health Watch system. This places each Local Authority region into one of four levels. Heat wave conditions occur when the maximum daytime temperature and minimum nighttime temperature rise above the threshold for a particular region. The length of time above that threshold determines the level. Level 1 represents normal summer conditions. Level 2 occurs when there is a 60% or higher risk that the temperature will be above the threshold levels for two days and the intervening night. Level 3 arises when the temperature has been above the threshold for the preceding day and night, and there is a 90% or higher chance that it will stay above the threshold in the following day. Level 4 is triggered if conditions are more severe than those of the preceding three levels. Each of the first three levels gives rise to a particular state of readiness and response by the social and health services. Level 4 involves a more widespread response. The threshold for a heat wave occurs when there are at least three days above 25 °C (77 °F) across much of the country. Greater London has a threshold of 28 °C (82 °F).

In Ireland, a heat wave is defined as temperatures exceeding 25 °C (77 °F) for five or more consecutive days.

==== North America ====
In the United States, definitions also vary by region. They usually involve a period of at least two or more days of excessively hot weather. In the Northeast, a heat wave is typically when the temperature reaches or exceeds 90 °F (32.2 °C) for three or more consecutive days. This is not always the case. This is because the high temperature ties in with humidity levels to determine a heat index threshold. The same does not apply to drier climates. A heat storm is a Californian term for an extended heat wave. Heat storms occur when the temperature reaches 100 °F (37.8 °C) for three or more consecutive days over a wide area (tens of thousands of square miles). The National Weather Service issues heat advisories and excessive heat warnings when it expects unusual periods of hot weather.

In Canada, heat waves are defined using the daily maximum and minimum temperatures, and in most of the country, the humidex as well, exceeding a regional threshold for two or more days. The threshold in which daily maximum temperatures must exceed ranges between 28 °C (82 °F) in Newfoundland and 35 °C (95 °F) in interior British Columbia, though this threshold is much lower in Nunavut, ranging between 22 °C (72 °F) and 26 °C (79 °F).

==== Oceania ====
In Adelaide, South Australia, a heat wave is five consecutive days at or above 35 °C (95 °F), or three consecutive days at or over 40 °C (104 °F). The Australian Bureau of Meteorology defines a heat wave as three or more days of unusual maximum and minimum temperatures. Before this new Pilot Heatwave Forecast there was no national definition for heat waves or measures of heat wave severity.

In New Zealand, heat waves thresholds depend on local climatology, with the temperature threshold ranging between 27 °C (81 °F) in Greymouth and 32 °C (90 °F) in Gisborne.

== Marine heatwaves ==
Marine heatwaves have become a prominent subject of research in recent years, reflecting the fact that since the turn of this century many ocean areas have experienced peaks of temperatures, along with more frequent, more intense, and more prolonged warming events than ever met on record. The genesis of marine heatwaves is mainly driven by a combination of oceanic and atmospheric factors, often triggered by high pressure systems that will reduce cloud cover and increase solar absorption by the sea surface. Human-induced climate change appears bound to play a growing role in the development of marine heatwaves, with increasing impacts on marine ecosystems, such as mass mortality in benthic communities, coral bleaching events, disruptions in fishery catches, and shifts in species distributions.

== Observations ==
Heat storms—generally defined as heat waves of long duration and covering wide areas—have increased in recent decades, under one definition growing from five per year in the 1960s to 102 per year in the 2020s through September 2026. Spikes in heat storms have often followed within months after El Niño events.

Large increases in both the frequency and intensity of extreme weather events (for increasing degrees of global warming) are expected.

It is possible to compare heat waves in different regions of the world with different climates thanks to a general indicator that appeared in 2015. With these indicators, experts estimated heat waves at the global scale from 1901 to 2010. They found a substantial and sharp increase in the number of affected areas in the last two decades.

One study in 2021 investigated 13,115 cities. It found that extreme heat exposure of a wet bulb globe temperature above 30 Celsius tripled between 1983 and 2016, and if the effect of population growth (increasing the urban heat island effect) during those years is excluded, the exposure increased a further 50%. The researchers compiled a comprehensive list of past urban extreme heat events. A study done in 2024 found that out of 1,028 examined cities worldwide, over 90% of them experienced amplified exposure to heatwaves due to urbanization-induced warming.

== Causes ==
Heat waves form when a high pressure area at an altitude of 3,000–7,600 metres (9,800–24,900 feet) strengthens and remains over a region for several days and up to several weeks. This is common in summer in both the Northern and Southern Hemispheres. This is because the jet stream 'follows the sun'. The high pressure area is on the equator side of the jet stream in the upper layers of the atmosphere.

Weather patterns are generally slower to change in summer than in winter. So, this upper level high pressure also moves slowly. Under high pressure, the air sinks toward the surface. It warms and dries adiabatically. This inhibits convection and prevents the formation of clouds. A reduction of clouds increases the shortwave radiation reaching the surface. A low pressure area at the surface leads to surface wind from lower latitudes that brings warm air, enhancing the warming. The surface winds could also blow from the hot continental interior towards the coastal zone. This would lead to heat waves on the coast. They could also blow from high towards low elevations. This enhances the subsidence or sinking of the air and therefore the adiabatic warming.

In the eastern regions of the United States a heat wave can occur when a high pressure system originating in the Gulf of Mexico becomes stationary just off the Atlantic Seaboard. Hot humid air masses form over the Gulf of Mexico and the Caribbean Sea. At the same time hot dry air masses form over the desert Southwest and northern Mexico. The southwest winds on the back side of the high continue to pump hot, humid Gulf air northeastwards. This results in a spell of hot and humid weather for much of the eastern United States and into southeastern Canada.

In the Western Cape Province of South Africa, a heat wave can occur when the low-pressure area offshore and the high-pressure area inland combine to form a bergwind. The air warms as it descends from the Karoo interior. The temperature will rise about 10 Celsius from the interior to the coast. Humidity is usually very low. The temperature can be over 40 Celsius in summer. The highest temperature recorded in South Africa (51.5 Celsius) occurred one summer during a berg wind along the Eastern Cape coastline.

The level of soil moisture can intensify heat waves in Europe. Low soil moisture leads to a number of complex feedback mechanisms. These in turn can result in increased surface temperatures. One of the main mechanisms is reduced evaporative cooling of the atmosphere. When water evaporates, it consumes energy and therefore lowers the surrounding temperature. If the soil is very dry, then incoming radiation from the sun will warm the air. But there will be little or no cooling effect from moisture evaporating from the soil.

=== Climate change ===
New high temperature records have outpaced new low temperature records on a growing portion of Earth's surface.

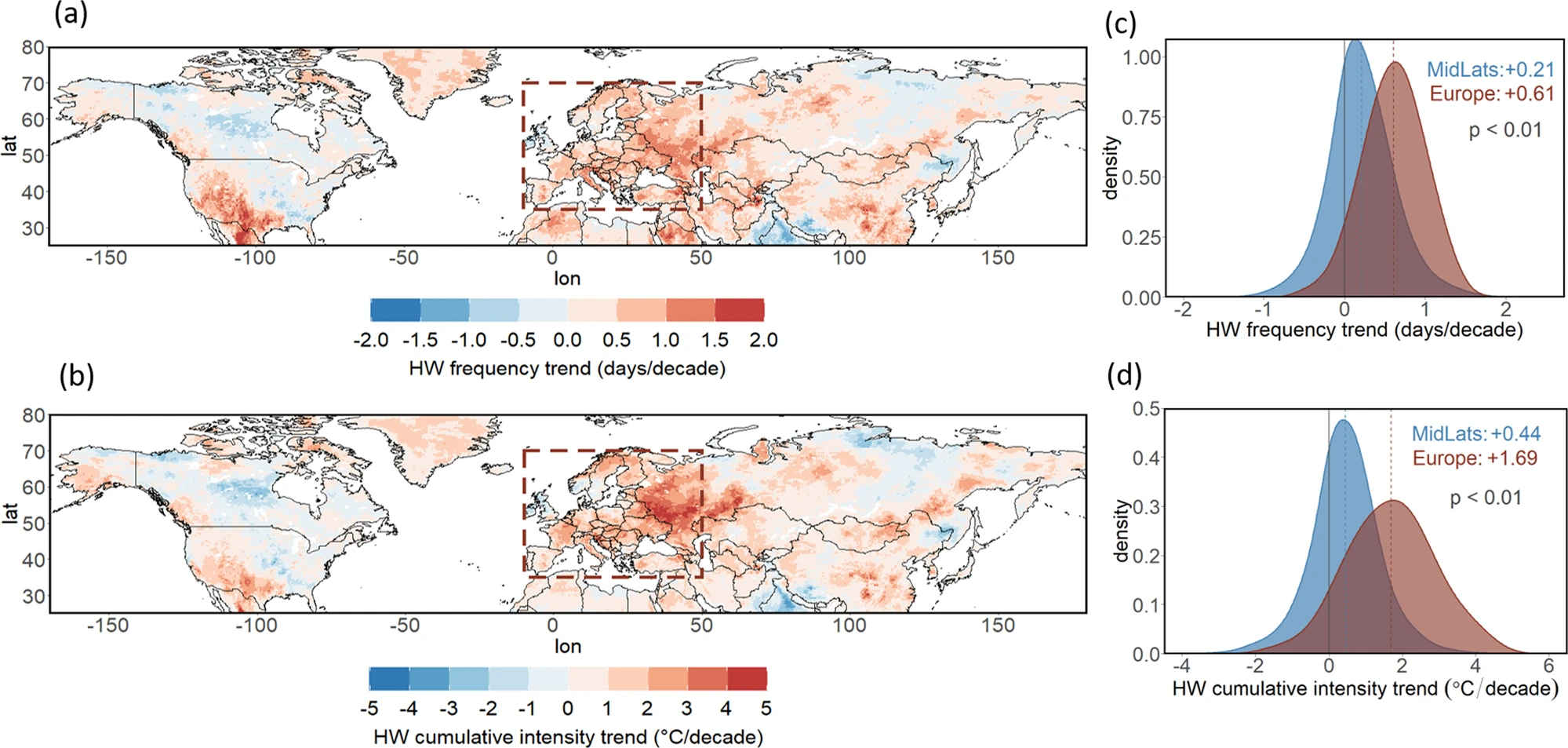
Map of increasing heatwave trends (frequency and cumulative intensity) over the midlatitudes and Europe, July–August 1979–2020

Heatwaves over land have become more frequent and more intense in almost all world regions since the 1950s, due to climate change. Heat waves are more likely to occur simultaneously with droughts. Marine heatwaves are twice as likely as they were in 1980. Climate change will lead to more very hot days and fewer very cold days. There are fewer cold waves.

Experts can often attribute the intensity of individual heat waves to global warming. Some extreme events would have been nearly impossible without human influence on the climate system. A heatwave that would occur once every ten years before global warming started now occurs 2.8 times as often. Under further warming, heatwaves are set to become more frequent. An event that would occur every ten years would occur every other year if global warming reaches 2 °C (3.6 °F).

== Impacts on human health ==
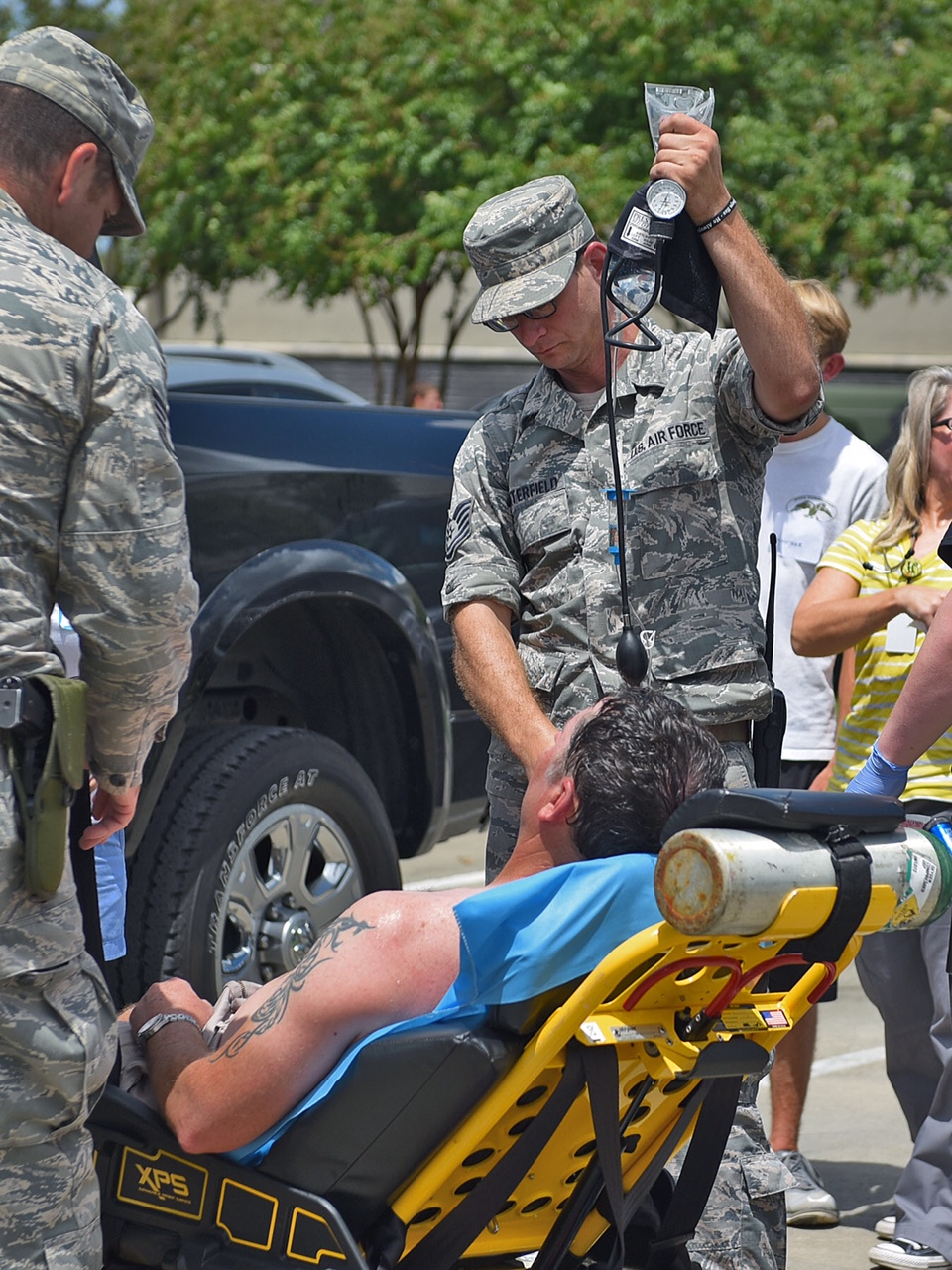
Heat stroke treatment at Baton Rouge during the 2016 Louisiana floods

=== Heat-related health effects for vulnerable humans ===
Heat illness is a spectrum of disorders due to increased body temperature. It can be caused by either environmental conditions or by exertion. It includes minor conditions such as heat cramps, heat syncope, and heat exhaustion as well as the more severe condition known as heat stroke. It can affect any or all anatomical systems. Heat illnesses include: heat stroke, heat exhaustion, heat syncope, heat edema, heat cramps, heat rash, heat tetany.

Prevention includes avoiding medications that can increase the risk of heat illness, gradual adjustment to heat, and sufficient fluids and electrolytes.

Exposure to extreme heat poses an acute health hazard, especially for people deemed as vulnerable. Vulnerable people with regard to heat illnesses include people with low incomes, minority groups, women (in particular pregnant women), children, older adults (over 65 years old), people with chronic diseases, disabilities and multiple long-term health conditions. Other people at risk include those living in urban environments (due to the urban heat island effect), outdoor workers and people who take certain prescription drugs.

Climate change increases the frequency and severity of heatwaves and thus heat stress for people. A 2022 global study found that heat-related deaths increased significantly between 2000 and 2019, particularly in tropical and low-income countries, underscoring the growing health burden from rising temperatures. Human responses to heat stress can include heat stroke and overheating (hyperthermia). Extreme heat is also linked to acute kidney injury, low quality sleep, and complications with pregnancy.Furthermore, it may cause the deterioration of pre-existing cardiovascular and respiratory disease. Adverse pregnancy outcomes due to high ambient temperatures include for example low birth weight and pre-term birth.Heat waves have also resulted in epidemics of chronic kidney disease (CKD). Prolonged heat exposure, physical exertion, and dehydration are sufficient factors for the development of CKD.

=== Mortality ===
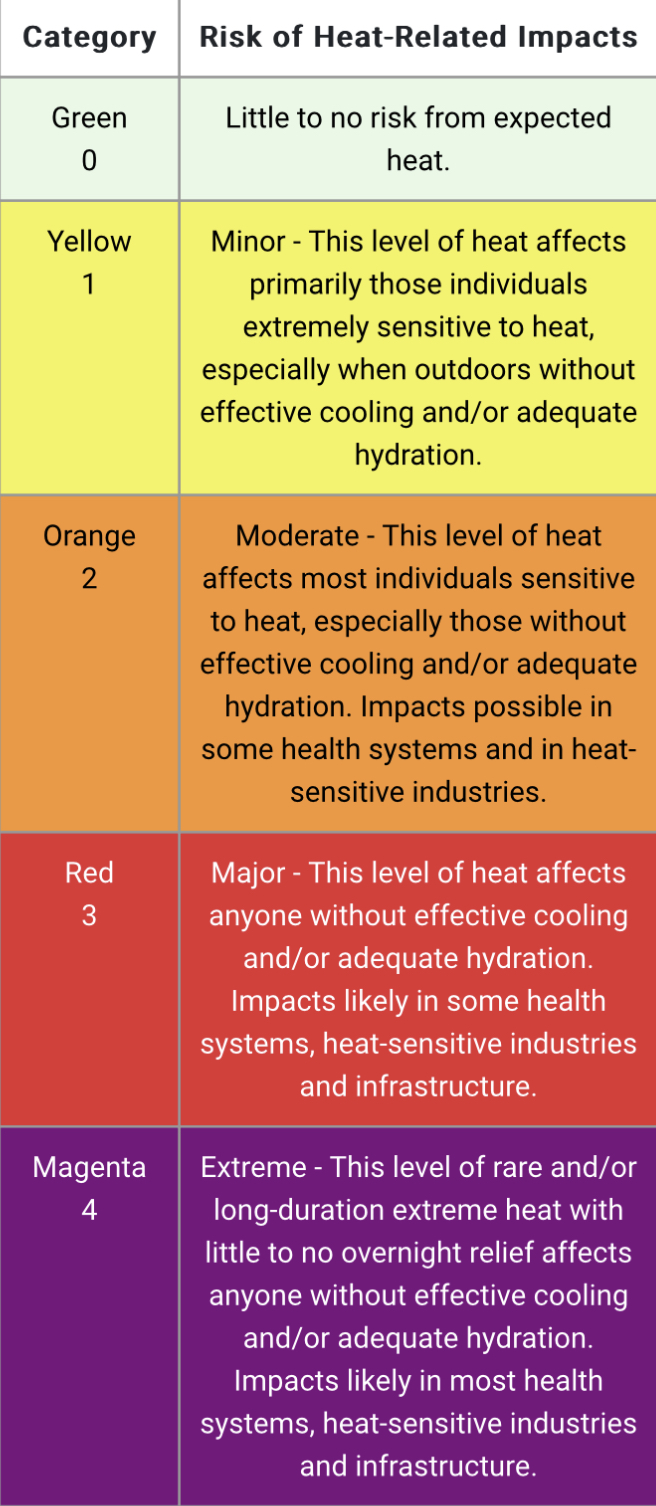
The National Weather Service risk categories for NWS HeatRisk

Health experts warn that "exposure to extreme heat increases the risk of death from cardiovascular, cerebrovascular, and respiratory conditions and all-cause mortality. Heat-related deaths in people older than 65 years reached a record high of an estimated 345 000 deaths in 2019". In more recent years in 2024, adults aged 80 and older are at even greater risk of heat-related mortality, making elderly individuals particularly vulnerable to the health impacts of extreme heat. More than 70,000 Europeans died as a result of the 2003 European heat wave. Also more than 2,000 people died in Karachi, Pakistan in June 2015 due to a severe heat wave with temperatures as high as 49 °C (120 °F).

A 2025 Countdown report published by The Lancet estimated that heat-related mortality worldwide averaged 546,054 deaths per year between 2012 and 2021, a 63.2% increase from the annual average of 334,672 deaths between 1990 and 1999. Population growth accounted for part of this increase, but the population-adjusted mortality rate also rose from 5.9 to 7.2 deaths per 100,000 people, representing a 23.3% increase.

==== Underreporting of fatalities ====
The number of heat fatalities is probably highly underreported. This is due to a lack of reports and to misreporting. When considering heat-related illnesses as well, actual death tolls from extreme heat may be six times higher than official figures. This is based on studies of California and Japan.

Part of the mortality during a heat wave may be due to short-term forward mortality displacement. In some heat waves there is a decrease in overall mortality in the weeks after a heat wave. These compensatory reductions in mortality suggest that heat affects people who would have died anyway, and brings their deaths forward.

Social institutions and structures influence the effects of risks. This factor can also help explain the underreporting of heat waves as a health risk. The deadly French heat wave in 2003 showed that heat wave dangers result from a combination of natural and social factors. Social invisibility is one such factor. Heat-related deaths can occur indoors, for instance among elderly people living alone. In these cases it can be challenging to assign heat as a contributing factor.

=== Heat index for temperature and relative humidity ===
NOAA national weather service: heat index
Temperature Relative humidity	80 °F (27 °C)	82 °F (28 °C)	84 °F (29 °C)	86 °F (30 °C)	88 °F (31 °C)	90 °F (32 °C)	92 °F (33 °C)	94 °F (34 °C)	96 °F (36 °C)	98 °F (37 °C)	100 °F (38 °C)	102 °F (39 °C)	104 °F (40 °C)	106 °F (41 °C)	108 °F (42 °C)	110 °F (43 °C)
40%	80 °F (27 °C)	81 °F (27 °C)	83 °F (28 °C)	85 °F (29 °C)	88 °F (31 °C)	91 °F (33 °C)	94 °F (34 °C)	97 °F (36 °C)	101 °F (38 °C)	105 °F (41 °C)	109 °F (43 °C)	114 °F (46 °C)	119 °F (48 °C)	124 °F (51 °C)	130 °F (54 °C)	136 °F (58 °C)
45%	80 °F (27 °C)	82 °F (28 °C)	84 °F (29 °C)	87 °F (31 °C)	89 °F (32 °C)	93 °F (34 °C)	96 °F (36 °C)	100 °F (38 °C)	104 °F (40 °C)	109 °F (43 °C)	114 °F (46 °C)	119 °F (48 °C)	124 °F (51 °C)	130 °F (54 °C)	137 °F (58 °C)	
50%	81 °F (27 °C)	83 °F (28 °C)	85 °F (29 °C)	88 °F (31 °C)	91 °F (33 °C)	95 °F (35 °C)	99 °F (37 °C)	103 °F (39 °C)	108 °F (42 °C)	113 °F (45 °C)	118 °F (48 °C)	124 °F (51 °C)	131 °F (55 °C)	137 °F (58 °C)		
55%	81 °F (27 °C)	84 °F (29 °C)	86 °F (30 °C)	89 °F (32 °C)	93 °F (34 °C)	97 °F (36 °C)	101 °F (38 °C)	106 °F (41 °C)	112 °F (44 °C)	117 °F (47 °C)	124 °F (51 °C)	130 °F (54 °C)	137 °F (58 °C)			
60%	82 °F (28 °C)	84 °F (29 °C)	88 °F (31 °C)	91 °F (33 °C)	95 °F (35 °C)	100 °F (38 °C)	105 °F (41 °C)	110 °F (43 °C)	116 °F (47 °C)	123 °F (51 °C)	129 °F (54 °C)	137 °F (58 °C)				
65%	82 °F (28 °C)	85 °F (29 °C)	89 °F (32 °C)	93 °F (34 °C)	98 °F (37 °C)	103 °F (39 °C)	108 °F (42 °C)	114 °F (46 °C)	121 °F (49 °C)	128 °F (53 °C)	136 °F (58 °C)					
70%	83 °F (28 °C)	86 °F (30 °C)	90 °F (32 °C)	95 °F (35 °C)	100 °F (38 °C)	105 °F (41 °C)	112 °F (44 °C)	119 °F (48 °C)	126 °F (52 °C)	134 °F (57 °C)						
75%	84 °F (29 °C)	88 °F (31 °C)	92 °F (33 °C)	97 °F (36 °C)	103 °F (39 °C)	109 °F (43 °C)	116 °F (47 °C)	124 °F (51 °C)	132 °F (56 °C)							
80%	84 °F (29 °C)	89 °F (32 °C)	94 °F (34 °C)	100 °F (38 °C)	106 °F (41 °C)	113 °F (45 °C)	121 °F (49 °C)	129 °F (54 °C)								
85%	85 °F (29 °C)	90 °F (32 °C)	96 °F (36 °C)	102 °F (39 °C)	110 °F (43 °C)	117 °F (47 °C)	126 °F (52 °C)	135 °F (57 °C)								
90%	86 °F (30 °C)	91 °F (33 °C)	98 °F (37 °C)	105 °F (41 °C)	113 °F (45 °C)	122 °F (50 °C)	131 °F (55 °C)									
95%	86 °F (30 °C)	93 °F (34 °C)	100 °F (38 °C)	108 °F (42 °C)	117 °F (47 °C)	127 °F (53 °C)										
100%	87 °F (31 °C)	95 °F (35 °C)	103 °F (39 °C)	112 °F (44 °C)	121 °F (49 °C)	132 °F (56 °C)										

Key to colors: Caution Extreme caution Danger Extreme danger

The heat index in the table above is a measure of how hot it feels when relative humidity is factored with the actual air temperature.

=== Psychological and sociological effects ===
Excessive heat causes psychological stress as well as physical stress. This can affect performance. It may also lead to an increase in violent crime. High temperatures are associated with increased conflict between individuals and at the social level. In every society, crime rates go up when temperatures go up. This is particularly the case with violent crimes such as assault, murder and rape. In politically unstable countries, high temperatures can exacerbate factors that lead to civil war.

High temperatures also have a significant effect on income. A study of countries in the United States found that the economic productivity of individual days declines by about 1.7 percent for each degree Celsius above 15 °C (59 °F).

=== Surface ozone (air pollution) ===
High temperatures also make the effects of ozone pollution in urban areas worse. This raises heat-related mortality during heat waves. During heat waves in urban areas, ground level ozone pollution can be 20 percent higher than usual.

One study looked at fine particle concentrations and ozone concentrations from 1860 to 2000. It found that the global population-weighted fine particle concentrations increased by 5 percent due to climate change. Near-surface ozone concentrations rose by 2 percent.

An investigation to assess the joint mortality effects of ozone and heat during the European heat waves in 2003 concluded that these appear to be additive.

== Impacts on societies ==
=== Economic outputs ===
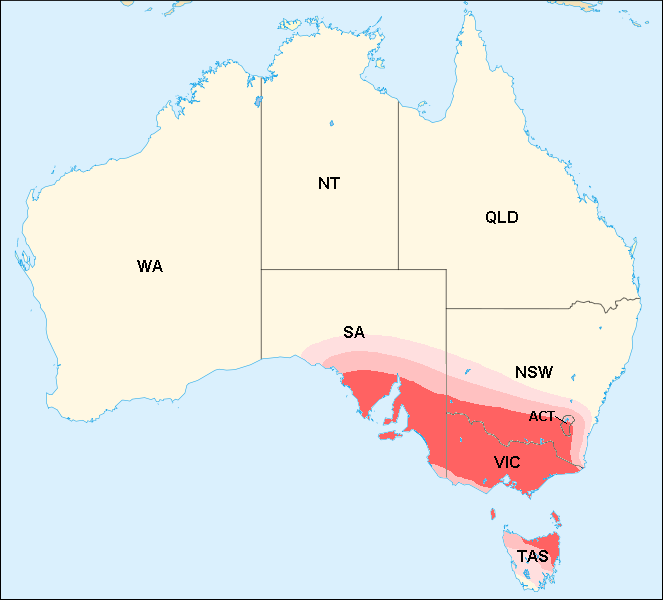
2009 southeastern Australia heat wave, thermal map approximate affected area shown in red

Calculations from 2022 suggest that heat waves will shrink the global economy by about 1 percent decrease by the middle of the 21st century. It has been calculated by the Food and Agriculture Organization of the United Nations that extreme temperatures have caused US$187 billion of damage between 1991 and 2023.

Heat waves often have complex effects on economies. They reduce labour productivity, disrupt agricultural and industrial processes and damage infrastructure that is not suitable for extreme heat. In 2016, a marine heatwave in Chile and its subsequent harmful algal bloom caused $800 million (USD) in export losses for the aquaculture industry as salmon and shellfish died off.

=== Agricultural outputs ===
Heat waves are a major threat to agricultural production. In 2019 heat waves in the Mulanje region of Malawi involved temperatures as high as 40 °C (104 °F). This and a late rain season scorched tea leaves and reduced yields.

==== Farmed animals ====
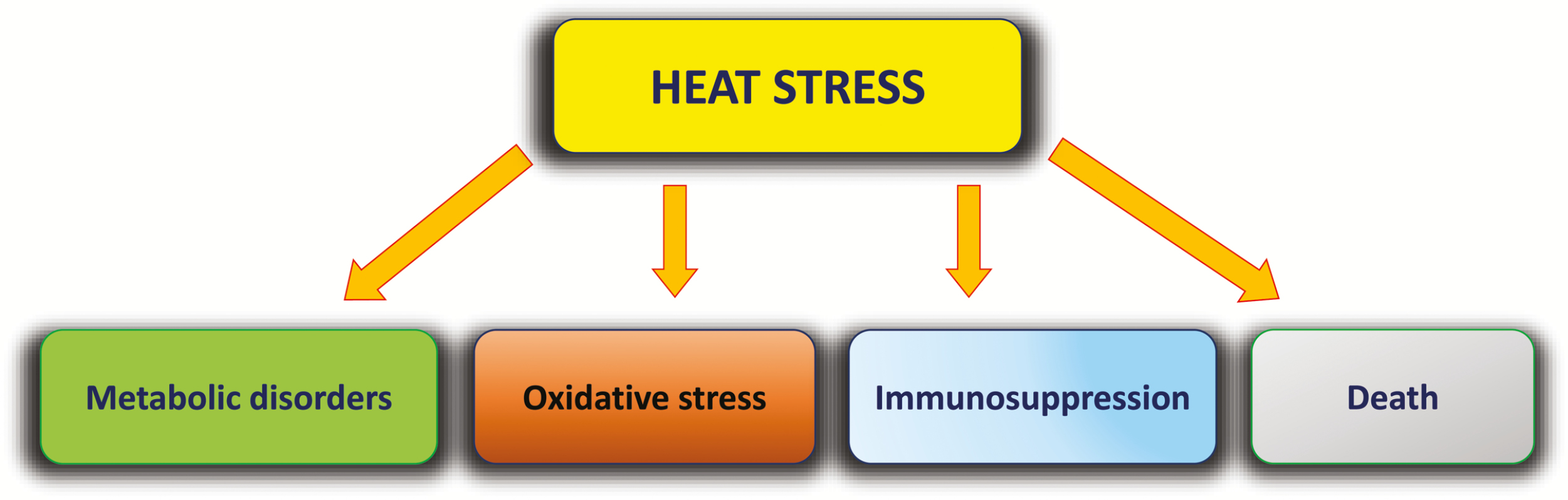
Impacts of heat stress on livestock animals

Once the body temperature of livestock animals is 3–4 °C (5.4–7.2 °F) above normal, this soon leads to "heat stroke, heat exhaustion, heat syncope, heat cramps, and ultimately organ dysfunction". Livestock mortality rates are already known to be higher during the hottest months of the year, as well as during heatwaves. During the 2003 European heat wave, for instance, thousands of pigs, poultry, and rabbits died in the French regions of Brittany and Pays-de-la-Loire alone.

Livestock can also suffer multiple sublethal impacts from heat stress, such as reduced milk production. Once the temperatures exceed 30 °C (86 °F), cattle, sheep, goats, pigs and chickens all begin to consume 3–5% less feed for each subsequent degree of temperature increase. At the same time, they increase respiratory and sweating rates, and the combination of these responses can lead to metabolic disorders. One examples is ketosis, or the rapid accumulation of ketone bodies, caused by the animal's body rapidly catabolizing its fat stores to sustain itself. Heat stress also causes an increase in antioxidant enzyme activities, which can result in an imbalance of oxidant and antioxidant molecules, otherwise known as oxidative stress. Feed supplementation with antioxidants like chromium can help address oxidative stress and prevent it from leading to other pathological conditions, but only in a limited way.

The immune system is also known to be impaired in heat-stressed animals, rendering them more susceptible to various infections. Similarly, vaccination of livestock is less effective when they suffer from heat stress. So far, heat stress had been estimated by researchers using inconsistent definitions, and current livestock models have limited correlation with experimental data. Notably, since livestock like cows spend much of their day laying down, comprehensive heat stress estimation needs to take account of ground temperature as well, but the first model to do so was only published in 2021, and it still tends to systematically overestimate body temperature while underestimating breathing rate.

=== Infrastructure ===
Heat waves cause roads and highways to buckle and melt, water lines to burst, and power transformers to detonate, causing fires. A heat wave can also damage railways, by buckling and kinking rails. This can slow down or delay traffic. It can even lead to cancellations of service when rails are too dangerous to traverse by trains.

Heat waves can negatively impact electricity generation, transmission, and distribution, potentially leading to power outages (blackouts or brownouts). Increased ambient temperatures significantly reduce the efficiency of both conventional power stations using oil, natural gas, and nuclear power, and renewable energy facilities using hydropower, solar power, and geothermal energy, leading to a potential failure to produce enough power to meet demand. Electric power transmission and distribution systems also lose efficiency as temperature increases.

Increased use of air conditioning during heat waves can put additional strain on electrical grids. In the United States, air conditioning can account for more than 70% of the peak residential demand for electricity on extremely hot days in some states; under the warming projected due to human-induced climate change, the demand for air conditioning could increase significantly. The combination of lowered output from power plants and increased demand for cooling, most commonly air conditioning, can reduce the reliability of the electrical system, often resulting in blackouts or brownouts.

During the 2006 North American heat wave, parts of California were without power from hours to days when infrastructure failed, such as when electrical transformers in northern California caught fire due to inadequate cooling. In Los Angeles, electrical transformers also failed, leaving thousands without power for as long as five days. The early 2009 southeastern Australia heat wave caused major power disruptions in the city of Melbourne. They left over half a million people without power as the heat wave blew transformers and overloaded a power grid.

== Impacts on the environment ==
=== Wildfires ===
A heat wave occurring during a drought can contribute to bushfires and wildfires. This is because a drought dries out vegetation, so it is more likely to catch fire. During the disastrous heat wave that struck Europe in 2003, fires raged through Portugal. They destroyed over 3,010 square kilometres (1,160 sq mi) of forest and 440 square kilometres (170 sq mi) of agricultural land. They caused about €1 billion worth of damage. High end farmlands have irrigation systems to back up crops.

=== Floods ===
Heat waves can also contribute to flooding. Because hot air is able to carry more moisture, heatwaves may be followed by extreme rainfall especially in mid-latitude regions. For example, the record-breaking heat wave that afflicted Pakistan beginning in May 2022 led to glacier melt and moisture flow. These were factors in the devastating floods that began in June and claimed over 1,100 lives.

=== Wild animals on land ===
Researchers have predicted that roughly 10–40% of all land vertebrate species will be affected by heat waves by 2099, depending on the amount of future greenhouse gas emissions. Heatwaves present an additional form of stress and evolutionary pressure for species that already deal with habitat loss and climate change.

Species have a thermal range of tolerance that describes the temperatures where they perform best. Temperature conditions that are outside of this range may experience decreased fitness and the inability to reproduce. The species with sufficient genetic variation will be able to ensure some individuals can survive frequent days of high temperatures in the future.

=== Oceans ===
Marine heatwaves may cause mass mortality in fish populations, especially for species that are better adapted to cooler temperatures. Species that have adapted to warmer temperatures may expand their range during a heatwave. These invasive species may outcompete the native species that experience higher mortality during a heatwave, which disrupts ecosystem functioning. Marine heatwaves have also been correlated with negative impacts on foundation species such as coral and kelp.

== Adaptations ==
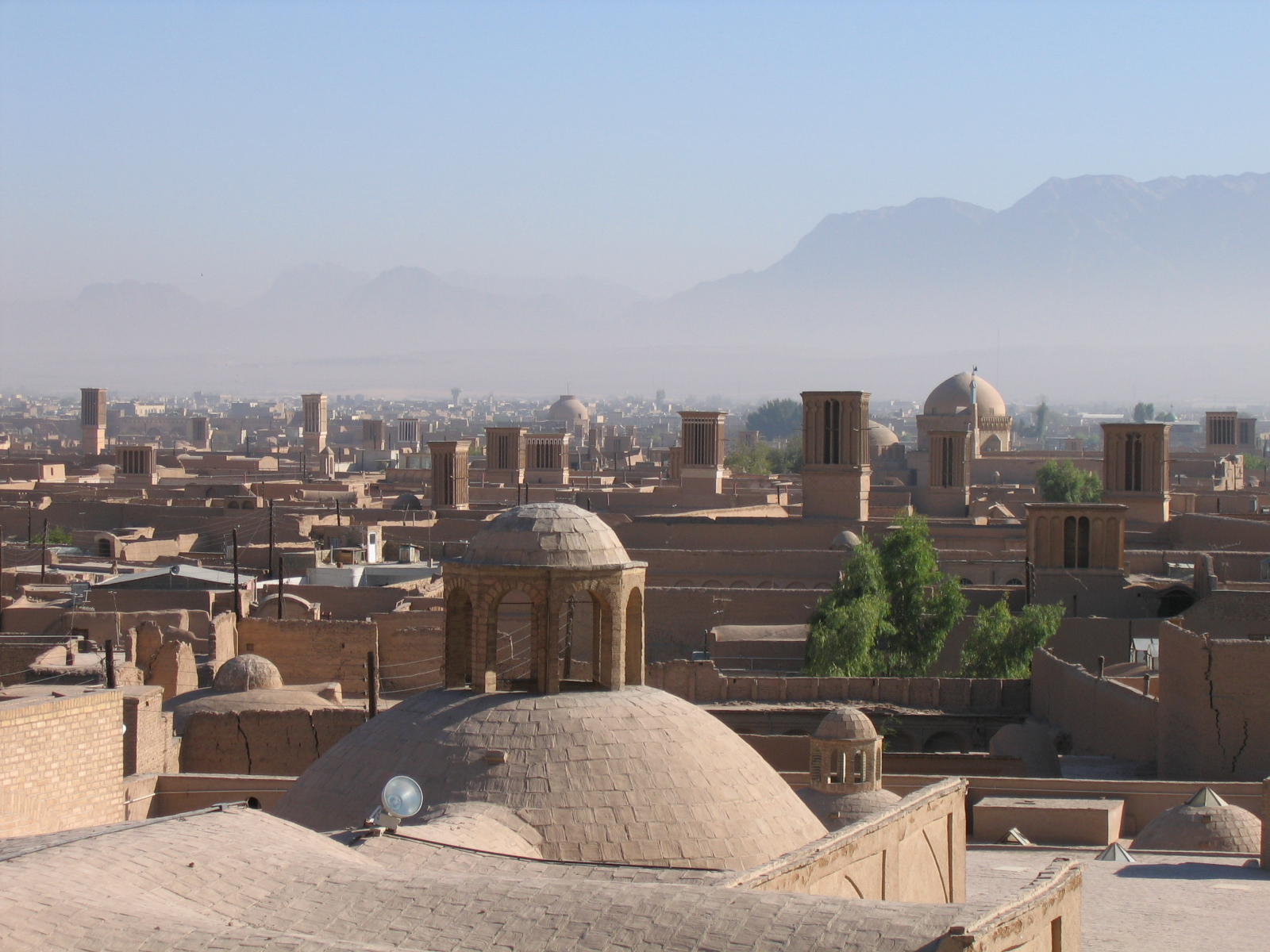
Wind towers and domes form part of the skyline of Yazd.

The countries expected to experience the highest temperatures in the future are also some of the poorest, with major portions of the overall populations lacking access to electricity and therefore a means for cooling. Climate change as well as growth expected over coming decades in countries such as India make a significant rise in the global and regional demands for air conditioning more likely. As of 2022, global distribution of air-conditioning units is skewed significantly towards wealthier countries. While installed air-conditioning units are expected to roughly double in the United States, China and European Union over the coming decades, the estimates for India are an order of magnitude larger, reflecting the growing middle class as well as the increasing need for cooling under anthropogenic climate change. Opinion polls found air conditioning tends to be the preferred adaptation method to heat.

A possible public health measure during heat waves is to set up air-conditioned public cooling centres. Adding air conditioning in schools provides a cooler work place. Policymakers, funders and researchers have created the Extreme Heat Resilience Alliance coalition under the Atlantic Council. This advocates for naming heat waves, measuring them, and ranking them to build better awareness of their impacts.

== By country or region ==
=== Around the world in 2024 ===
Human-caused climate change increased the probability of the 2024 Middle East (West Asia) heatwave by about a factor of 5 (center chart vs. left chart).

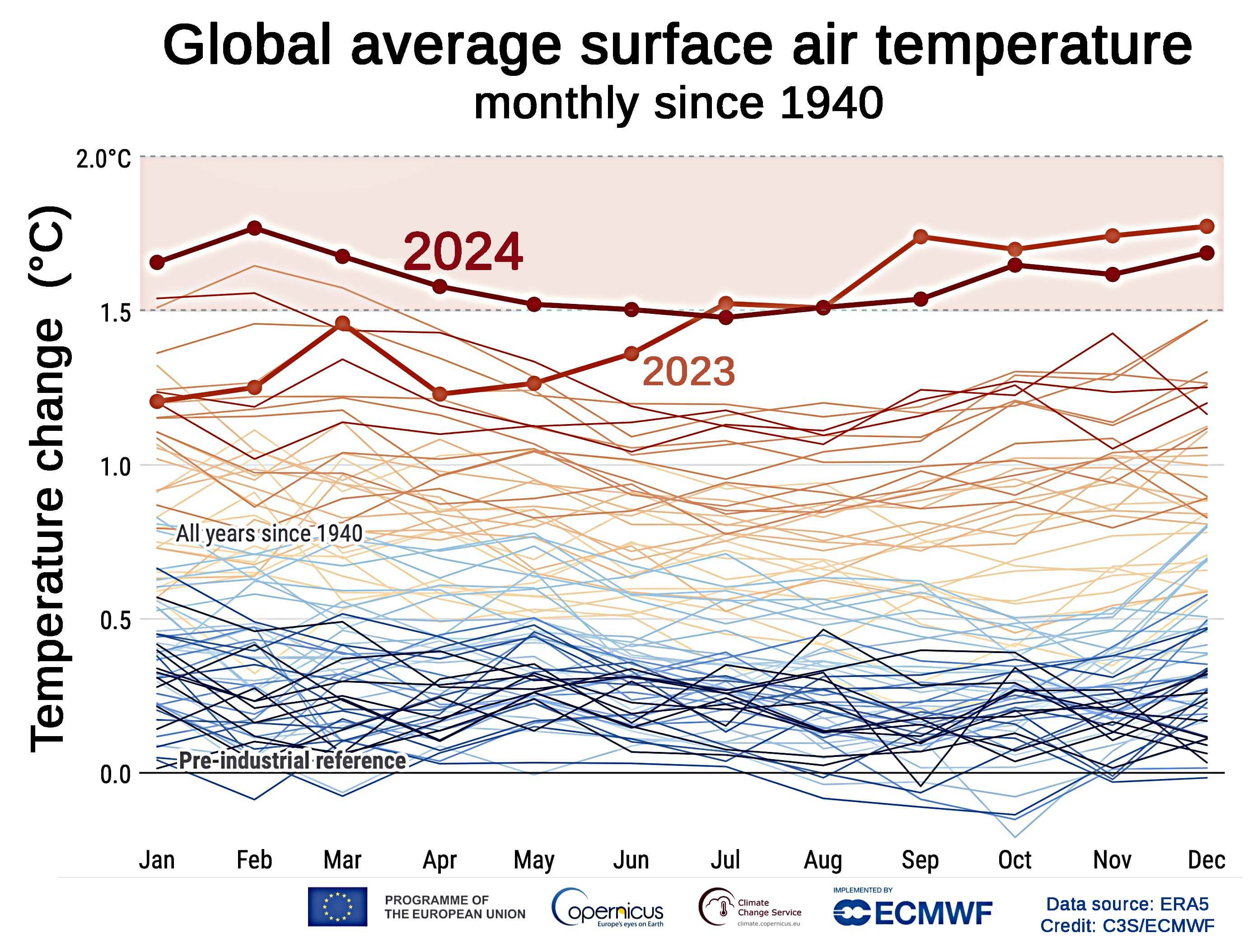
In 2024, Earth saw the highest average annual surface air temperature ever recorded, outpacing 2023 on an average basis.

- Since March 2024, severe heat waves impacted Mexico, the Southern United States, and Central America, leading to dozens of broken temperature records, mass deaths of animals from several threatened species, water shortages requiring rationing, increased forest fires, and over 48 deaths in Mexico with over 950 people suffering from heat-related ailments.
- In April 2024 Southeast Asia faced a severe heatwave, resulting in unprecedented high temperatures of up to 38.8 °C (101.8 °F) that caused school closures and prompted urgent health advisories throughout the region.
- In April 2024 Bangladesh and neighbouring region faced facing severe heatwaves. Schools and other institutions were closed due to severe heat across Bangladesh for the first time in history. On 30 April the temperature in Joshore reached up to 43.8 °C (110.8 °F). Pitch in roads started melting in the western region due to scorching heat. Many heat related deaths were recorded across the country.
- 2024 Indian heat wave – In May–June 2024, the longest heat wave occurred in India and Pakistan with a new record temperature for India's capital New Delhi of 49 °C (120 °F) (an even higher record of 53 °C (127 °F) had initially been reported in New Delhi on 29 May but was later found to be attributable to a faulty sensor), and temperatures in Pakistan getting as high as 52.2 °C (126.0 °F).
- 2024 European heatwaves – In mid-June 2024, Greece experienced a heatwave, Europe's first heatwave of the year. Temperatures in Greece were forecast to reach to 43 °C (109 °F). Turkey was also affected with temperatures hitting 44 °C (111 °F).
- In mid-June, high temperatures in Mecca, characterized as a heat wave, resulted in the deaths of pilgrims in the city for Hajj from countries including Indonesia, Jordan, Tunisia, and India. It was reported that as many as 1300 people may have died. Saudi authorities said most who died were not officially authorized to perform Hajj. Forecasts predicted temperatures as high as 45 °C (113 °F) on 19 June 2024. The heat also impacted Kuwait, where heightened demand caused officials at the Ministry of Electricity, Water and Renewable Energy to temporarily stop distribution of electricity to portions of the nation.
- 2024 Pakistan heat wave – In June 2024, Pakistan experienced a heat wave. The Edhi Foundation in Karachi said it transported a higher-than-normal number of bodies to the morgue during the period of 20 to 25 June.
- During the 2024 Summer Olympics, host city Paris, along with portions of Southern France and England, experienced a heatwave.
- 2024 Japan heatwaves – At least 59 heat-related deaths were recorded in Japan, with at least 62 temperature observation posts across Japan breaking temperature records in July 2024. According to the Japan Meteorological Agency (JMA), the average temperatures reached during the heatwaves represented the hottest for Japan in April and July since its record-keeping began in 1898.
- In December 2024, a heat wave occurred in Australia.

=== India ===
From April 2024 to June 2024, a severe and long heat wave affected India. The heat wave occurred during the Indian summer or pre-monsoon, which typically lasts from March to June, with peak temperatures in April and May. The year marked the third consecutive year of extreme heat waves in the country, a trend partly attributed to climate change.

Churu district in Rajasthan recorded a temperature of 50.5 °C (122.9 °F), the highest in India in eight years. A temperature of 52.9 °C was recorded in Mungeshpur, Delhi, and was initially thought to be record-breaking. However, it was later found to be approximately 3 °C too high due to a faulty sensor.

=== Southeast Asia ===
Since April 2024, several Southeast Asian countries have experienced record-breaking temperatures which have left several people dead. Heat indices peaked at 53 °C (127 °F) in Iba in the Philippines on 28 April 2024. The heat wave has been attributed to a combination of causes, including climate change and El Niño.

In some countries, the high heat has caused excessive energy demand. Drought conditions have worsened across the region. In Indonesia, dengue infections increased. In Myanmar, the heat wave exacerbated the humanitarian crisis caused by the ongoing civil war. Many government agencies have declared local emergencies and advised safety measures to protect residents from the heat, and some countries have closed schools or shortened their hours.

=== China ===
A study found the average resident in China was exposed to 16 days of heat waves in 2023, with more than 37,000 heat wave-related deaths. Besides, the number of work hours lost due to heat stress in China was 36.9 billion in 2023, and China's citizens experienced a 60% surge in lost safe outdoor activity hours, with each person losing 2.2 hours on average each day. The study predicted that by the 2060s, annual heat wave-related mortality is expected to reach 29,000 to 38,000 in China, with a 28% to 37% increase in work hours lost.

=== United States ===
US heat waves have increased in frequency, average duration, and intensity.
Also, heat wave seasons have grown in length.

Over decades, the average number of days spent in heat waves in the U.S. annually has increased, based on increases in both the average annual number of heat waves and on their average durations.

In July 2019, there were over 50 million people in the United States in jurisdictions with heat advisories. Scientists predicted that many records for highest low temperatures would be broken in the days following these warnings. This means the lowest temperature in a 24-hour period will be higher than any low temperature measured before.

According to a 2022 study, 107 million people in the US will experience extremely dangerous heat by the year 2053.

In September 2026, parts of Southern California were under extreme heat warnings during a heat wave in which high humidity, partly from the remnants of former Tropical Storm Marie and warm ocean temperatures, was forecast to increase heat discomfort and limit overnight relief.

Heat waves are the most lethal type of weather phenomenon in the United States. Between 1992 and 2001, deaths from excessive heat in the United States numbered 2,190, compared with 880 deaths from floods and 150 from tropical cyclones. About 400 deaths a year on average are directly due to heat in the United States. The 1995 Chicago heat wave, one of the worst in US history, led to approximately 739 heat-related deaths over 5 days. In the United States, the loss of human life in hot spells in summer exceeds that caused by all other weather events. These include lightning, rain, floods, hurricanes, and tornadoes.

About 6,200 Americans need hospital treatment each summer, according to data from 2008. This is due to excessive heat, and those at highest risk are poor, uninsured or elderly.

The relationship between extreme temperature and mortality in the United States varies by location. Heat is more likely to increase the risk of death in cities in the northern part of the country than in southern regions. As a whole, people in the United States appear to be adapting to hotter temperatures further north each decade. This might be due to better infrastructure, more modern building design and better public awareness.

== See also ==
- Dog days
- Cold wave
- List of heat waves
- List of severe weather phenomena
- Urban heat island
