= Occupational heat stress =

Net heat load of a worker

Occupational heat stress is the net load to which a worker is exposed from the combined contributions of metabolic heat, environmental factors, and clothing worn, which results in an increase in heat storage in the body. Heat stress can result in heat-related illnesses, such as heat stroke, hyperthermia, heat exhaustion, heat cramps, heat rashes, and chronic kidney disease (CKD). Although heat exhaustion is less severe, heat stroke is a medical emergency and requires emergency treatment, which if not provided, can lead to death.

Heat stress causes illness but also may account for an increase in workplace accidents, and a decrease in worker productivity. Worker injuries attributable to heat include those caused by: sweaty palms, fogged-up safety glasses, and dizziness. Burns may also occur as a result of accidental contact with hot surfaces or steam. In the United States, occupational heat stress is becoming more significant as the average temperatures increase but remains overlooked. There are few studies and regulations regarding heat exposure of workers.

== Risk factors ==
Heat-related illnesses from occupational heat stress is impacted by multiple factors. Workers exposed to high temperatures, humidity, and limited air movement, especially outside workers, are vulnerable to heat illness. Physiologic factors can also impact a worker's vulnerability, specifically if their job requires physical exertion, which produces metabolic heat. Workers can also be more vulnerable to heat illness if they are dehydrated from sweating and not drinking enough water or have a low level of physical fitness. Certain medications can also make it more difficult for someone to adapt to high temperatures, such as some common antibiotics, as well as some diabetes, cardiovascular disease, and psychiatric medications. Workers who have cardiovascular diseases, respiratory illnesses, diabetes, hypertension, or obesity, or who are currently pregnant, are also at higher risk for heat illness. Additionally, wearing heavy or thick personal protective equipment and clothing can prevent workers from sweating properly, which prevents the body from effectively cooling. A recent umbrella review suggests that female and relocated workers face greater physiological strain due to occupational heat exposure.

A study estimates that climate change is to blame for an additional 25 billion working hours lost annually in India from 2001 until 2020 compared to the previous 20 years. Due to their physical demands and exposure to the elements, agricultural workers have among of the highest rates of heat-related disease. According to studies, low-income workers are disproportionately affected by heat stress because they are less able to take breaks or leave hazardous work environments.

=== Acclimatization ===
According to the National Institute for Occupational Safety and Health (NIOSH), acclimatization is a biological process that an individual will go through to adjust to a stimulus following continued exposure. Physiologically, acclimatization to heat will allow a worker's body to more efficiently cool itself when exposed to high temperatures. When a worker has adjusted to working in a hotter environment, they will have a lower heart rate, earlier onset of sweating, and increased blood flow to blood vessels near the skin, allowing their body to more efficiently cool itself than a worker who is not acclimatized. (see below section on acclimatization schedules for specific processes).

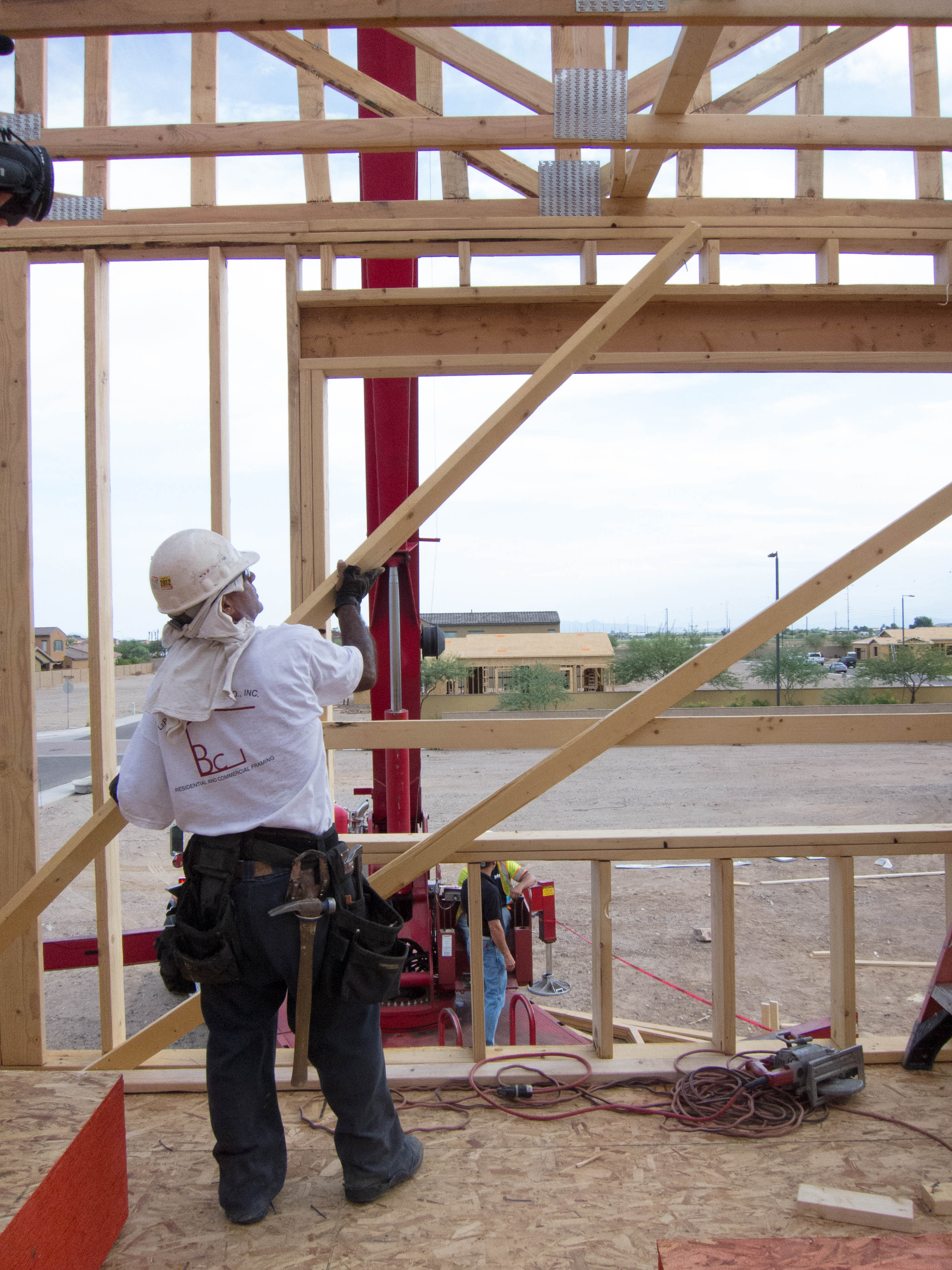
Construction workers are at high risk for heat illnesses as their jobs are normally outside and require physical exertion.

== Examples of high risk occupations ==
Workers in many occupations are at high risk for exposure to heat stress. Especially vulnerable are outdoor workers who have highly physical tasks to complete, such as firefighters, miners, military personnel, construction workers, landscapers, athletes, delivery persons, and agricultural workers. Additionally, many indoor jobs also require high-exertion work in very hot conditions, for example factory workers, boiler room workers, welders, and kitchen staff. In unusually hot conditions, all workers should be aware of their risk for heat illness and should ensure that they drink plenty of water and take breaks in cool places to avoid any severe impacts.

== Vulnerable populations ==
Certain populations face increased risk of occupational heat stress due to a combination of environmental exposure, occupational conditions, and socioeconomic factors. While physiological vulnerability is addressed elsewhere in this article, structural and social determinants also play a significant role in determining who is most affected.

=== Outdoor and physically demanding work ===
Outdoor workers, including agricultural and construction workers, face disproportionate occupational heat stress risk due to the combination of prolonged sun exposure, physically demanding labor, and structural barriers that limit access to protective resources. The International Labour Organization (ILO) estimates that agricultural work accounts for approximately 60% of productive hours lost globally to heat stress, with construction contributing an additional 19%.

=== Low-wage and seasonal workers ===
Workers in low-wage or seasonal employment may face additional risk due to limited access to protective resources such as protective clothing, shade, hydration stations, and scheduled rest breaks. In some occupational settings, piece-rate payment structures, in which workers are compensated per unit of output rather than by the hour, may discourage workers from taking breaks, increasing cumulative heat exposure during shifts.

=== Socioeconomic and structural factors ===
Socioeconomic conditions can contribute to disparities in heat-related illness by affecting exposure both during and outside of working hours. Workers with lower incomes may have limited access to air-conditioned housing or transportation, increasing total heat burden across the day. In the United States, immigrant and migrant workers are disproportionately represented in outdoor, low-wage, and agricultural occupations, and may face additional barriers including geographic isolation, substandard housing, limited access to occupational safety training, and language barriers that affect comprehension of heat illness prevention information. Research indicates that the disproportionate burden of occupational heat stress is concentrated in regions with high rates of informal employment and limited social protections, including parts of West Africa, Southern Asia, and Latin America.

=== Barriers to care and underreporting ===
Access barriers may limit both prevention and treatment of heat-related illness among vulnerable workers. These include limited access to healthcare services, lack of health insurance, and concerns about job security that may discourage workers from reporting symptoms or seeking care. Underreporting of heat-related illness and injury has been documented in occupational settings, suggesting that surveillance data may underestimate the true burden of disease among affected worker populations.

Agricultural heat-related illnesses are also frequently undercounted in official occupational surveillance datasets and underrepresented in public news reporting. A 2026 content analysis of U.S. news coverage captured in the AgInjuryNews.org surveillance system between 2016 and 2024 identified only 14 media-reported agricultural heat-related incidents, all of the farmer and farmworker cases being single-victim fatalities and found that coverage emphasized regulatory investigations rather than prevention strategies.

=== Climate change and the One Health perspective ===
Climate change has been associated with increases in the frequency, duration, and intensity of heat waves, contributing to a growing risk of heat-related illness among occupational populations globally. The WHO has identified outdoor and manual workers as among the groups most susceptible to exertional heat stress as temperatures continue to rise. The ILO projects that by 2030, the equivalent of 80 million full-time jobs could be lost worldwide as a result of heat-related reductions in productivity.

From a One Health perspective, occupational heat stress reflects the intersection of human health, animal health, and environmental conditions. Rising temperatures affect not only workers directly but also the agricultural ecosystems and food-producing systems on which many of the most heat-exposed workers depend. Disruptions to these systems, including crop failure, soil degradation, and heat-related illness in livestock, can compound occupational risk for agricultural communities in affected regions. Addressing occupational heat stress within this framework requires integrated approaches that consider environmental conditions, labor policy, housing, and health equity alongside workplace-level interventions.

== Symptoms of heat stress ==
The Signs and Symptoms of Heat Illness is intended to acquaint participants with OSHA's guidelines for heat-related injuries on the job. When someone is exposed to hot conditions, they will begin to sweat and have an increased heart rate. If they do not drink enough water to replenish the fluid they are sweating out, a worker can become dehydrated. This is why drinking extra water while working in hot environments is critical. If workers continually exert themselves in hot environments, they may develop muscle cramps from sweating too much, which can be relieved by taking a break and drinking extra water and electrolytes. Additionally, workers can develop heat rash, which should be treated in a cool place and soothed with powder. For more severe heat illnesses, it is important for workers to be able to identify the differences between heat exhaustion and heat stroke in order to protect themselves and their colleagues.

=== Heat exhaustion ===
When a person is experiencing heat exhaustion, they will be actively and heavily sweating, though their skin may feel cool and appear pale. If their temperature is taken, it could be normal or slightly high, and their pulse will be fast, but it may be difficult to detect or feel through the skin. Additionally, the person may exhibit a number of different symptoms such as headaches, muscle cramps, and fatigue, as well as nausea, vomiting, and in extreme cases, fainting. Compared to healthy workers, workers who are older, pregnant, or have previous diseases like diabetes or heart disease are more likely to experience heat exhaustion more quickly. When assigning duties in heated environments, employers should be mindful of these risk concerns.

If a worker is exhibiting these symptoms, it is important that they take a break from work to sit in a cool place, use cool, damp towels on their head and neck to further cooling, and sip water slowly as they recover. If a worker does not recover within an hour or continues to vomit, it is important to seek medical attention for them quickly.

=== Heat stroke ===
If a worker begins to feel the signs of heat stroke from over exertion in a high temperature environment, they will normally have a very high temperature, which can be measured with a thermometer. Their skin could be hot to the touch and damp with sweat, though they will not be actively sweating. If their pulse is taken, it will be fast and easy to detect. Outwardly, the worker could show signs of dizziness and confusion, and they may have digestive discomfort and nausea. In severe cases, workers can pass out. The most serious heat-related sickness is heat stroke, which, if left untreated, can cause irreversible organ damage or even death. If heat stroke is suspected, workers should never be left alone; instead, emergency services should be contacted immediately.

If a worker is displaying these symptoms, it is important to call 911 to get them immediate medical attention. Additionally, helping the person move to a cooler place and covering their head and neck in cool, damp cloths can help while waiting for emergency services to arrive. It is important to wait for a medical professional to see them before asking them to drink a lot of water.

== Measurement and monitoring ==
=== Measurements ===
NIOSH has set Wet Bulb Globe Temperature (WBGT)-based Recommended Alert Limits (RALs) for unacclimatized workers and Recommended Exposure Limits (RELs) for acclimatized workers to use in determining, monitoring, and responding to the risk of heat exposure and related impacts. While different ranges of temperatures are used to determine what types of protective action should be implemented, there is no universal safe limit applied across all occupational settings. This is because safety will depend on factors specific to the environments and tasks of a specific job, as well as the workers' physical health and fitness.

There are many different ways to measure temperature. Typically, a thermometer can be used to measure environmental temperature. However, high humidity, or the amount of water that has evaporated into the air in the form of water vapor, can often make the temperature outside feel hotter than the measured temperature. To address this, a heat index measure includes the air's relative humidity, or a measure of how much moisture is in the air compared to if the air were saturated with water vapor. This measure of humidity along with temperature provides more information on what workers should expect to feel in terms of heat if working outside.

Additionally, some sources also report wet-bulb temperature, which is considered an informative measure for individuals who will be working in direct sunlight. This measure takes into account both temperature and humidity, but also includes measures of wind speed, cloud cover, and angle of the sun at different times of the day.

OSHA uses a measure called the Adjusted Air Temperature to determine how often workers should be monitored, which involves the equation:

$T_a = T+ (13\times \%\text{Sunshine})$

Where T is temperature measured in degrees Fahrenheit (°F) and percent sunshine is measured on a spectrum from 100% (no clouds, noticeable shadows) to 0% (total cloud cover, no shadows).

=== Monitoring ===
OSHA recommends monitoring worker's heart rate, temperature, and body water loss throughout shifts in hot conditions. When the adjusted temperature is 90 °F or above, it is recommended that even healthy, acclimatized workers have these measures monitored every 45 minutes. Workers who are not acclimatized or who are wearing impermeable equipment or clothing should be monitored every 15 minutes.

NIOSH and OSHA have also created a Heat Index App for mobile devices that provides information on temperature, humidity, risk of heat illness, as well as hourly forecasts of temperature and information on how to prevent and treat heat illnesses.

== Prevention ==
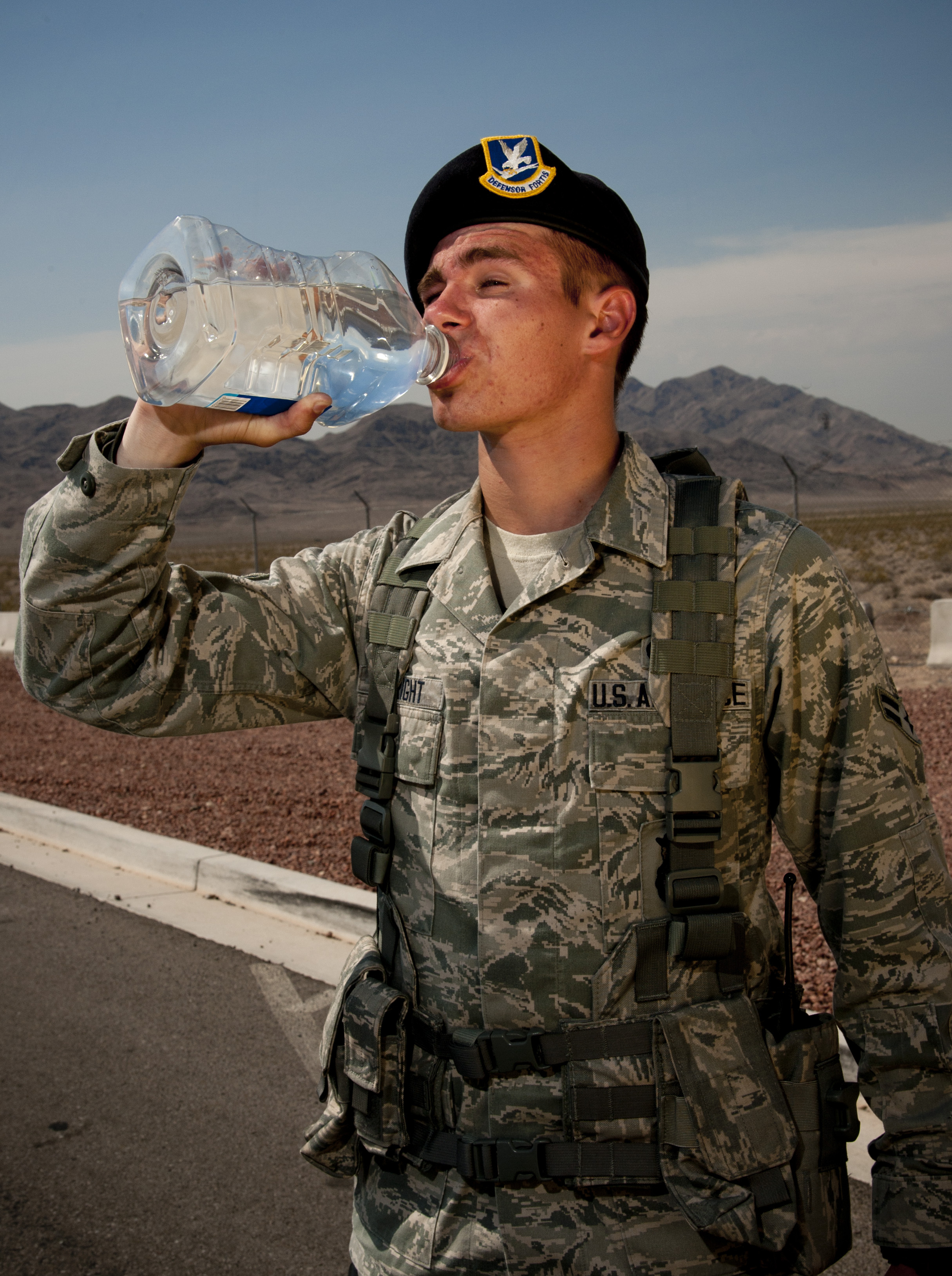
Working in hot conditions can make the body lose fluids through sweating, so workers must drink extra water in these conditions to replenish those fluids and prevent dehydration.

Employers can establish prevention programs, which focus on having protocols to gradually increases workloads and concede on allowing on more breaks for new hired workers. Employers can control heat stress through engineering controls, work practices, providing training, implementing an acclimatization schedule, providing water and encouraging workers to drink often, and ensuring workers take appropriate rest breaks to cool down.

=== Engineering controls ===
Employers can provide air conditioners for indoor work spaces and for indoor break areas. Fans can also be used together with air conditioners, and misting fans can be used outside for added cooling. Additionally, increasing building ventilation and improving the insulation of hot surfaces will reduce indoor temperatures. If all work is completed outdoors, a shaded area should be provided with ample water for workers to take breaks often. Employers can use cooling vests, cooling towels, and misting stations to lower workers' body temperatures during shifts in outdoor environments without air conditioning. Another efficient engineering strategy is to schedule labor-intensive jobs during cooler morning hours and steer clear of the hottest periods between 11 a.m. and 3 p.m.

=== Work practices ===
Ample breaks with space provided in shaded or cooled areas are important for preventing heat stress related illnesses. Employers should also supply water for workers throughout the day, as workers need to drink more water when working in hot environments than they would otherwise. Additionally, on particularly hot days, limiting high-exertion tasks as much as possible is important for keeping a worker's metabolic temperature down. Additionally, employers want to think about putting in place a buddy system in which employees keep an eye out for early indications of heat illness during their shifts. Early detection of symptoms can stop a minor heat illness from developing into a potentially fatal situation.

=== Training ===
All employees should be trained to recognize the symptoms of heat stress. Supervisors should monitor their employees throughout the day for these symptoms and, for larger teams, a buddy system can be used to group workers to monitor each other for signs of heat illness. Additionally, informing workers about their working conditions and risk of heat illness is important, specifically in making sure that everyone understands what the heat index means and what extra precautions to take during higher risk periods.

=== Acclimatization schedules ===
Acclimatization can occur over different time periods for different people, but NIOSH recommends allowing workers to be exposed to gradually higher levels of heat over 7–14 days for acclimatization. New workers without recent exposure to heat may require additional time to adjust. On the first day of an acclimatization process, workers without previous heat exposure should be asked to complete, at most, 20% of their typical workday. After this, their workload can increase by 20% for each day of the process.

For workers with previous exposure working in high temperature settings, acclimatization can occur as fast as four days, starting with workers completing 50% of their typical work duration on the first day. NIOSH strongly suggests that workers who are currently adjusting to new conditions should be supervised closely for signs of heat stress, especially those who may adjust slower due to age, pre-existing health conditions, or lower levels of physical fitness. A worker's level of acclimatization must also be maintained, and if workers are absent from the working conditions for more than a week, they will need to begin the acclimatization process again.

== Occupational standards ==
=== International ===
International Organization for Standardization helps set standards for monitoring environments, analyzing data, and interpreting results. The International Labour Organization has set forth guidelines aimed at safeguarding workers from heat stress, especially in developing nations where there may be fewer regulations. The World Health Organization has also recognized occupational heat stress as an increasing public health issue, advising employers to secure access to sufficient water, rest, and shade as essential protections for all outdoor laborers.

=== United States ===
Section 5(a)(1) of the Occupational Safety and Health Act of 1970 declares that "Each employer shall furnish to each of his employees employment and a place of employment which are free from recognized hazards that are causing or are likely to cause death or serious physical harm to his employees."

The Mine Safety and Health Administration provides guidelines and recommendations to employers for preventing heat stress among workers. There guidelines and recommendations are not enforced regulations, but instead completely voluntary.

National Institute for Occupational Safety and Health (NIOSH) conducts research on occupational hazards such as heat stress in order to provide better intervention methods and protect workers.

Only three of the fifty states have created worker regulations regarding heat: California, Washington, and Minnesota. California Code of Regulations states that employers of high risk outdoor workers are entitled to protection against heat. The employer must provide access to water and shade, practice high heat procedures, practice emergency response procedures, and practice acclimatization methods. Washington State Legislature states that employers of high risk outdoor workers follow regulations to prevent heat stress. The United States does not have a federal standard for heat stress, even though some states have implemented their own regulations. With rising temperatures due to climate change, advocates are calling for a formal federal requirement. Meanwhile, OSHA has used the General Duty Clause to hold companies accountable for heat-related violations. Minnesota Administrative Rules state that indoor ventilation and temperature are regulated to prevent heat stress.

==== NIOSH recommended standard ====
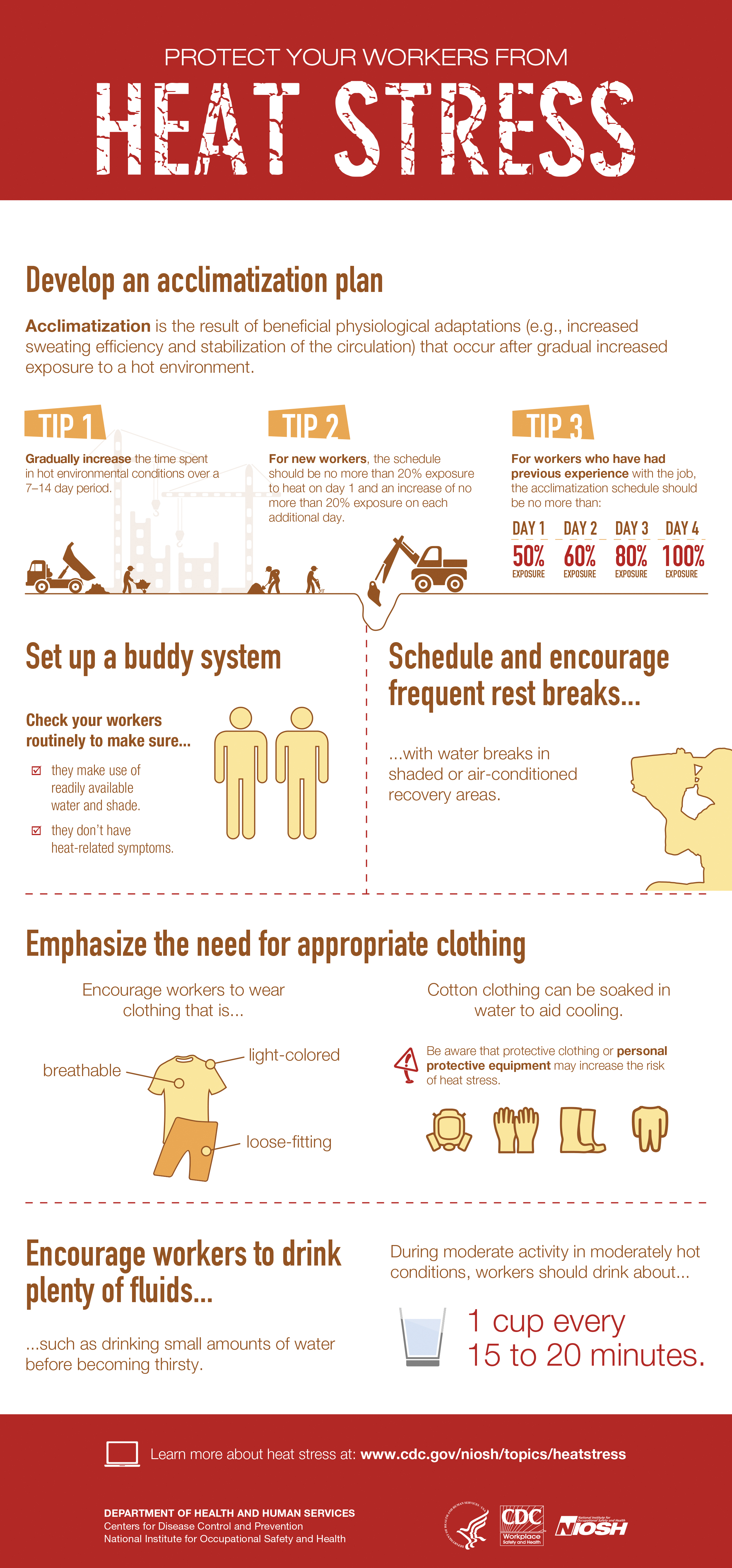
"Protect Your Workers From Heat Stress", CDC.

Beginning in 1972, NIOSH published a recommended standard for hot work environments, and has periodically revised to take new scientific findings into account. The intent of the NIOSH Recommended Standard for Occupational Exposure to Heat and Hot Environments is to prevent injury, disease, death, and reduced productivity. The recommendations include workplace limits and surveillance, medical monitoring, surveillance of heat-related sentinel health events, posting of hazardous areas, protective clothing and equipment, worker information and training, control of heat stress, and record keeping.

===== Control of heat stress =====
Control of heat stress has recommended general requirements, engineering controls, work and hygienic practices, and a heat alert program.

====== General Requirements ======
NIOSH recommends that every employer should create and implement a written program aimed at reducing heat exposures. Engineering and work practice controls should be used to reduce exposures, and a heat alert program should be implemented.

====== Engineering Controls ======
Air temperatures should be reduced so it does not exceed skin temperatures. Radiant heat should be reduced by creating barriers around the source. Evaporative heat loss can be increased by increasing air movement around the worker.

====== Work and Hygienic Practices ======
The time workers spend in hot environments should be limited, with an increase of recovery time spent in cool environments. Use of more efficient procedures and tools is beneficial to reducing metabolic demands of the job. Heat tolerance may be increased by implementing a heat tolerance plan and increasing physical fitness. Employees should be trained to recognize and treat the early signs and symptoms of heat illnesses, and employers should provide cool water for their employees.

====== Heat Alert Program ======
Heat alert programs should be developed for implementation when hotter than normal temperatures, or a heat wave occurs.

== See also ==
- Heat exhaustion
- Heat stroke
- Dehydration
- Heat index
