= Heat exhaustion =

Heat-related illness caused by the loss of water and electrolytes through sweating

Heat exhaustion is a heat-related illness characterized by the body's inability to effectively cool itself, typically occurring in high ambient temperatures or during intense physical exertion. In heat exhaustion, core body temperature ranges from 37 °C to 40 °C (98.6 °F to 104 °F). Symptoms include profuse sweating, weakness, dizziness, headache, nausea, and lowered blood pressure, resulting from dehydration and serum electrolyte depletion. Heat-related illnesses lie on a spectrum of severity, where heat exhaustion is considered less severe than heat stroke but more severe than heat cramps and heat syncope.

Climate change and increasing global temperatures have led to more frequent and intense heat waves, raising the incidence of heat exhaustion. Risk factors include hot and humid weather, prolonged heat exposure, intense physical exertion, limited access to water or cooling, and certain medications that can exacerbate fluid and serum electrolyte losses including diuretics, antihypertensives, anticholinergics, and antidepressants. Children, older adults, and individuals with certain pre-existing health conditions are more susceptible to heat exhaustion due to their reduced ability to regulate core body temperature.

Prevention strategies include wearing loose and lightweight clothing, avoiding strenuous activity in extreme heat, maintaining adequate hydration, and gradually acclimatizing to hot conditions. Public health measures, such as heat warnings and community cooling centers, also help prevent heat exhaustion during extreme weather events. Treatment involves moving to a cooler environment, rehydrating, and cooling the body. Untreated heat exhaustion can progress to heat stroke, a life-threatening condition characterized by a core body temperature above 40 °C (104 °F) and central nervous system dysfunction.

== Signs and symptoms ==
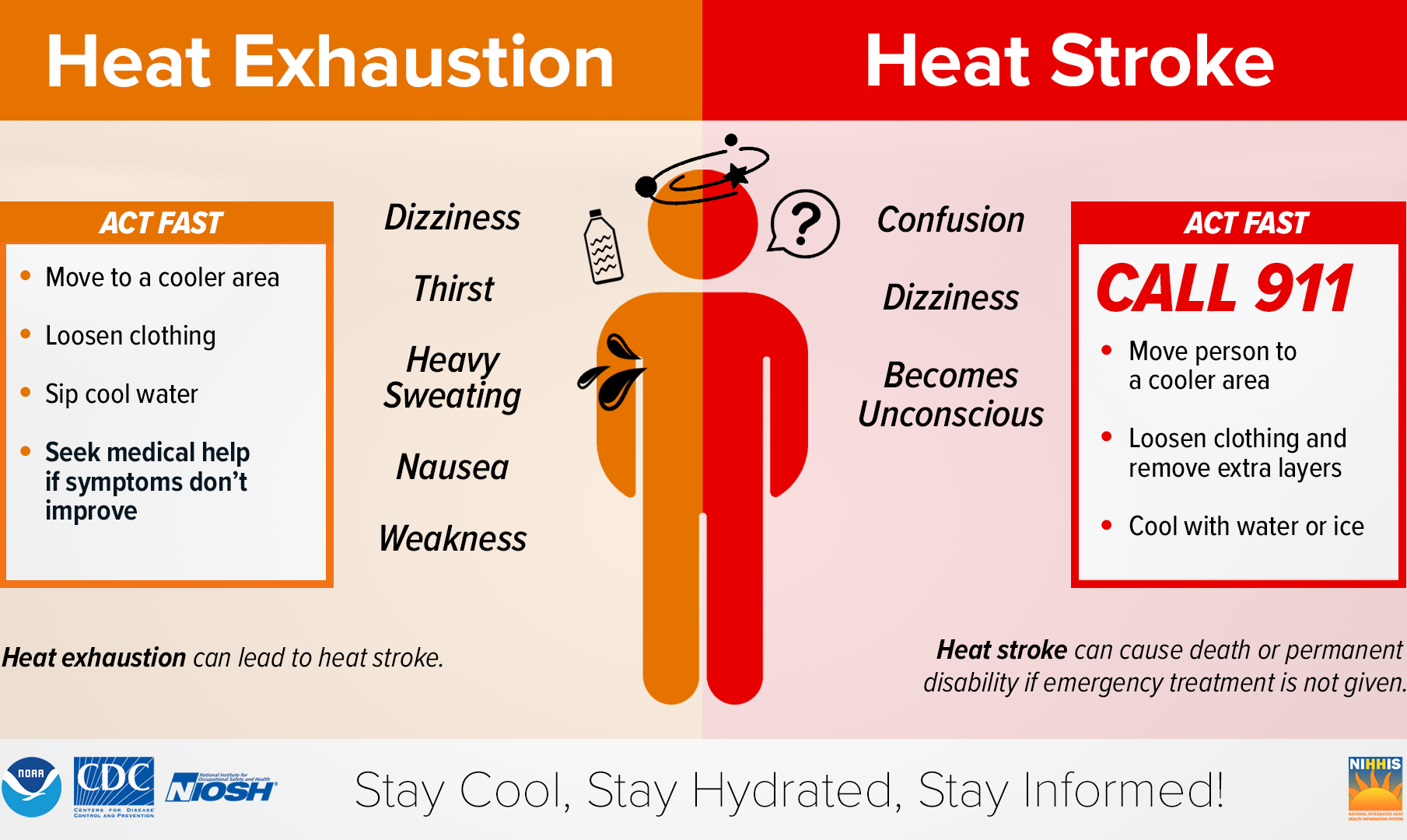
Heat exhaustion versus heat stroke, U.S. National Weather Service resource

=== Common ===
Sources:

- Elevated heart rate
- Lowered blood pressure
- Elevated core body temperature (not exceeding 40 °C or 104 °F)
- Elevated respiratory rate (i.e., faster breathing)
- Profuse sweating
- Dehydration
- Serum electrolyte depletion
- Weakness and fatigue
- Persistent muscle cramps
- Skin tingling
- Nausea and vomiting
- Dizziness and light-headedness
- Irritability
- Headache

=== Less common ===
Sources:

- Pallor
- Hot and dry skin
- Core body temperature exceeding 40 °C or 104 °F - This is one of the criteria for heatstroke
- Syncope
- Central nervous system dysfunction (e.g., altered mental status, loss of spatial awareness, loss of bodily movement control, seizures, etc.)

=== Comparison with other heat-related illnesses ===
Common signs and symptoms of heat exhaustion can also be observed in other heat-related illnesses such as heat cramps, heat syncope, and heat stroke. Heat cramps, a mild form of heat-related illness, is characterized by persistent abdominal, quadricipital, and calf muscle contractions. Heat syncope, also referred to as exercise-associated collapse, is a moderate form of heat-related illness characterized by a temporary loss of consciousness. Unlike heat exhaustion, heat cramps and heat syncope do not have systemic effects.

Heat exhaustion is a precursor to heat stroke, a severe form of heat-related illness. Heat stroke is more likely than heat exhaustion to cause pallor, hot and dry skin, syncope, and dysfunction of the central nervous system (e.g., altered mental status, loss of spatial awareness, loss of bodily movement control, seizures, etc.). Central nervous system dysfunction and a core body temperature exceeding 40 °C or 104 °F are the primary differentiators between heat exhaustion and heat stroke. One of the earliest indicators of heat stroke is altered mental status, which can manifest as delirium, confusion, reduced alertness, loss of consciousness, etc. Prompt recognition and treatment are crucial to prevent multi-organ failure and death.

== Physiology ==
The human body maintains a core body temperature at around 37 °C or 98.6 °F through mechanisms controlled by the thermoregulatory center within the hypothalamus. When the body is exposed to high ambient temperatures, intense physical exertion, or both, the thermoregulatory center will initiate several processes to dissipate more heat:

- Blood vessels near the skin surface dilate, increasing blood flow to the skin to facilitate heat loss through radiation and convection
- Heart rate increases to support elevated blood flow to the skin
- Eccrine sweat glands in the skin produce sweat, which evaporates from the skin surface

=== Heat cramps and heat syncope ===
Heat-related illnesses lie on a spectrum of severity. Conditions on the lower end of this spectrum include heat cramps and heat syncope. The electrolyte depletion theory proposes that increased sweating during intense physical exertion in high ambient temperatures results in a depletion of serum electrolytes (e.g., sodium, potassium, etc.) that causes sustained involuntary muscle contractions, or heat cramps. However, the contribution of intense physical exertion and high ambient temperatures to serum electrolyte depletion in the absence of significant dehydration has been contested by more recent research, which proposes an alternative theory. The neuromuscular theory proposes that muscle fatigue increases the excitability of α1 muscle spindles and decreases the inhibitory input from Golgi tendon organs, leading to sustained involuntary muscle contractions.

In heat syncope, or exercise-associated collapse, there is an increased dilation of blood vessels near the skin's surface and a pooling of blood in the lower extremities due to a decrease in vasomotor tone, which is the extent of control over the constriction and dilation of blood vessels. This results in a drop in blood pressure when not lying down and a temporary reduction in blood flow to the brain, leading to fainting.

=== Heat exhaustion ===
Heat exhaustion is a moderate form of heat-related illness characterized by increasingly overwhelmed thermoregulatory mechanisms. In heat exhaustion, the core body temperature rises to between 37 °C and 40 °C (98.6 °F and 104 °F). To dissipate heat, blood flow to the skin can increase up to 8 liters per minute, accounting for a significant proportion of the cardiac output. This increase in peripheral circulation leads to a reduction in central blood volume—the volume of blood contained within the heart, lungs, and large blood vessels. The heart rate further increases, but the cardiac output and blood pressure continue to drop. At the same time, profuse sweating occurs, with losses up 1-2 liters of sweat per hour. This sweating exacerbates the reduction in central blood volume and leads to dehydration and serum electrolyte depletion, particularly hyponatremia (low serum sodium) and hypokalemia (low serum potassium). The combination of decreased blood flow to vital organs and serum electrolyte losses results in various symptoms, mentioned in "Signs and symptoms." Additionally, the body's respiratory rate increases to aid in heat dissipation through the lungs.

=== Heat stroke ===
Heat exhaustion can progress to heat stroke, a severe form of heat-related illness characterized by complete failure of thermoregulatory mechanisms. Heat stroke is defined by two key features: a core body temperature above 40 °C (104 °F) and central nervous system dysfunction. In classic heat stroke, sweating ceases due to sweat gland dysfunction or depletion. This loss of evaporative cooling further accelerates heat accumulation. The resulting hyperthermia leads to widespread cellular dysfunction, including:

- Alterations in enzyme function
- Protein denaturation
- Disruption of cellular membranes.

Hyperthermia causes direct cellular damage, triggering a systemic inflammatory response. This inflammatory cascade can result in multi-organ dysfunction, potentially leading to:

- Acute kidney injury
- Liver failure
- Disseminated intravascular coagulation

== Causes ==
There is increasing evidence linking higher temperatures to a variety of diseases and disorders as well as elevated mortality and morbidity rates. The Intergovernmental Panel on Climate Change (IPCC) projects that temperatures will rise by up to 1.5 °C in the future due to ongoing greenhouse gas emissions. Climate change exacerbates extreme temperatures, resulting in more intense and frequent heat waves. As this trend continues, populations with greater susceptibility to heat exhaustion, such as children, older adults, and individuals with chronic diseases, are at an increased risk.

Common causes of heat exhaustion and other heat-related illnesses include:

- Prolonged exposure to hot, sunny, or humid weather conditions
- Extended time spent in high-temperature environments without adequate cooling
- Engaging in strenuous activities through work, exercise, or sports, particularly in hot conditions
- Insufficient fluid intake leading to dehydration
- Overconsumption of fluids without adequate electrolyte replacement, leading to serum electrolyte depletion
- Wearing tight or non-breathable clothing that does not allow heat to escape, trapping heat close to the body
- Use of certain medications that impair thermoregulation, such as diuretics, antihypertensives, anticholinergics, and antidepressants
- Sudden exposure to high temperatures without gradual acclimatization

== Risk factors ==
Risk factors for heat exhaustion include:

- Wearing dark, padded, or insulated clothing, hats, and helmets (e.g., football pads, turnout gear, etc.) that trap heat and impede cooling
- Higher body fat percentage, which can hinder heat dissipation
- Presence of fever, which elevates body temperature and lowers heat tolerance
- Children younger than 5 years old and adults older than 65 are at a higher risk of serious heat illness due to impaired thermoregulation, even at rest, especially in hot and humid conditions without adequate cooling
- People with long term medical conditions such as diabetes
- Insufficient access to water, air conditioning, or other cooling methods
- Use of medications that increase the risk of heat exhaustion, including diuretics, first-generation antihistamines, beta-blockers, antipsychotics, anticholinergics, MDMA ('Ecstasy', 'Molly'), and other amphetamines

== Medication impact ==
Medications such as diuretics, antihypertensives, anticholinergics, and antidepressants can cause electrolyte imbalances, drug-induced hypohidrosis (reduced sweating), or drug-induced hyperhydrosis (excessive sweating). This disrupts the body's ability to regulate core temperature and increases the risk of heat exhaustion.

Anticholinergic medications inhibit the parasympathetic arm of the autonomic nervous system involving the muscarinic M3 acetylcholine receptors, which often results in symptoms of dry mouth, increased thirst, as well as an increased risk of dehydration. Other medications containing anticholinergic properties, such as certain antidepressants and first-generation antihistamines, have comparable side effects. For patients at risk of or experiencing heat exacerbation, taking these medications can further increase their risk.

Certain antidepressants, such as tricyclic antidepressants and selective serotonin reuptake inhibitors (SSRIs), as well as opioids that stimulate histamine release, can cause hyperhidrosis, leading to significant fluid and serum electrolyte depletion Though the mechanisms are not fully understood, antihypertensives such as ACE inhibitors, beta-blockers, and diuretics have shown to decrease heat tolerance. In addition, ACE inhibitors and diuretics can cause electrolyte imbalances, increase thirst, and increase risk of dehydration Beta-blockers limit the body's ability to redirect hyperthermic blood away from the body's core and towards the skin for cooling. If dehydration and electrolyte imbalances are left untreated, they can lead to severe complications, progress to a more severe heat-related illness such as a heatstroke, and can potentially be fatal.

The management of drug-induced hypohidrosis and hyperhidrosis should be thoroughly evaluated and discussed with a healthcare professional. Treatment options may include discontinuation of the medication, a dose adjustment, a drug substitution to a different drug-class, adaptation to new behavioral and environmental changes, or the addition of another agent that can counteract the side effects.

== Special populations ==
=== Pediatrics ===
Children (under the age of 18 years old) have a lower heat tolerance compared to adults due to decreased homeostatic regulatory systems, increased metabolic rates, and decreased cardiac output. Strenuous exercise in high-temperature conditions is the leading cause of heat-related illness in children. The dehydration stemming from heat-related illness is what puts children at risk for thermoregulatory dysfunction. Thermoregulatory dysfunction only worsens the ability for children to fight heat exhaustion because it leads to decreased sweat capabilities and increased core temperature response. Similar to that of adults, the best way to combat and prevent heat exhaustion in children is to properly condition prior to exercise exertion, hydrate, allow for temperature adjustment, and clothe accordingly.

=== Pregnancy ===
Although there are not many studies on how the rates of heat exhaustion differ amongst the pregnant population, the adverse effects due to heat exhaustion in the pregnant population can be fatal. Heat exhaustion becomes much more common within pregnant women who perform the same tasks they had while not pregnant. While their symptoms are no different than the most common, such as dizziness, fatigue, and dehydration, the extreme adverse effects include increased preterm births, miscarriages, and birth defects. The reason for these more serious adverse effects is that pregnancy causes higher metabolic and cardiovascular demands, and the presence of heat exhaustion only amplifies these demands further. The dehydration symptom of heat exhaustion is vital to overcome because proper hydration is deeply necessary for proper development of the fetus and metabolic activity. To combat the dehydration aspect, the amount of water intake must be increased from the intake amount prior to pregnancy and hot environments should be avoided to prevent sweating.

== Prevention ==
Ways to prevent and lower risk of heat exhaustion include:

- Public widespread announcements of heat waves or rapid increases in temperature
- Staying up to date on daily weather reports
- Heat shelters throughout communities
- Wearing loose fitting and lighter fabric clothing
- Trying to stay well hydrated, unless fluid intake is limited
- Finding shady cool areas to rest, for those who are doing lots of outdoor activities or work
- Avoiding prolonged exposure to hot environments, such as tropical sunshine in the middle of the day
- If possible, avoiding exposure to the sun during daytime
- Drinking adequate fluids
- Avoiding exertion and exercise in hot weather
- Avoiding medications that can be detrimental to the regulation of body heat

== Diagnosis ==
A diagnosis of heat exhaustion most commonly is diagnosed by medical professionals with various physical examinations. Through examination a person would have their temperature checked and questioned about their recent activity. If the medical professionals suspect a person's heat exhaustion has progressed into heat stroke they may then lead with these varying tests to verify;

- Blood test, medical professionals when conducting a blood test look for low blood sugar or potassium. They may also look for the presence of unwanted gases in a person's blood.
- Urinalysis, an urinalysis or urine test is a test to measure color, clarity, pH levels, glucose concentration, and protein levels. The test additionally can check a person's kidney function, which is common to be affected by classic heat stroke.
- Muscle function tests, medical professionals use muscle function tests to check for rhabdomyolysis, which is severe damage to a person's skeletal muscle tissue.

== Treatment ==
=== First aid ===
First aid for heat exhaustion or heat stroke includes:

- Moving the person to a shaded, fanned, or air-conditioned place
- Removing any excess or tight clothing to facilitate cooling
- Applying wet towels or ice packs wrapped in cloth to the forehead, neck, armpits, and groin, and using a fan to cool the person down
- Lying the person down on their back and elevating their feet above head level to improve blood circulation
- Having the person drink cool water or sports drinks, also referred to as electrolyte drinks, provided they are conscious, alert, and not vomiting (Only applies to heat exhaustion)
- Turning the person on their side if they are vomiting to prevent choking
- Monitoring the person's vital signs, which includes their heart rate, blood pressure, breathing rate, and body temperature
- Monitoring the person's mental status (i.e., confusion, delirium, reduced alertness etc.)
- Contacting emergency medical services if their situation does not improve rapidly or worsens

=== Emergency medical treatment ===
If an individual with heat exhaustion receives medical treatment, emergency medical technicians (EMTs), doctors, and/or nurses may also:

- Provide supplemental oxygen
- Administer intravenous fluids and electrolytes if they are too confused to drink and/or are vomiting

=== Do Not ===
If an individual is experiencing heat exhaustion or any other heat related illness DO NOT:

- Administer fever medications such as aspirin or paracetamol as they can be harmful for the individual
- Administer salt tablets as they can worsen dehydration
- Use alcohol or caffeine containing products as they can make it harder for the individual to control their body temperature
- Give anything by mouth if the person is vomiting or unconscious

== Heat warning resources ==
With high temperatures becoming more frequent, there are resources available to stay up to date on sudden changes in the weather. In the United States, OSHA in collaboration with the NIOSH have a Heat Safety Tool app that notifies their users with real time data on weather forecasts in a certain location, common side effects of heat related illnesses, and how the temperature feels like outside allowing individuals to safely plan out their day based on the weather. Additional resources include monitoring weather in your area of the United States based on zip code using weather.gov, being aware of cooling centers in your area, knowing how to save and use less energy within your household, and being well informed of certain populations who are more vulnerable to heat related illnesses than others. Apart from these resources, there are radio stations and news weather forecasts that continue to provide information on changes in the weather and temperature both globally and within your area.

== Prognosis ==
After adequate rest and rehydration, most individuals typically recover from their heat exhaustion. However, when heat exhaustion is left untreated, the most common disease progression is heat stroke. According to the CDC, a typical trait indicating a person is having a heat stroke is when their body temperature reaches 40 °C/104 °F or higher in a span of 10 to 15 minutes. In addition to a high body temperature, they will also experience central nervous system dysfunction such as alteration in their mental status and slurred speech. Another possible illness that heat stroke can lead to is rhabdomyolysis or rapid injury to skeletal muscle especially when heat stroke is caused by physical exertion. When an individual experiences rhabdomyolysis, that damaged skeletal tissue releases toxic muscle components such as myoglobin into the bloodstream and can cause issues such as coca cola colored urine, myalgia, and kidney damage due to the blocked tubules to name a few. If a person is experiencing a heat stroke and is not properly treated, that can further progress to metabolic abnormalities, irreversible damage to multiple organs in the body, and death as a result.

== See also ==
- Occupational heat stress
