= Heat illness =

Condition caused by high body temperature

Heat exhaustion
- Other names: Heat-related illness
- Specialty: Emergency medicine

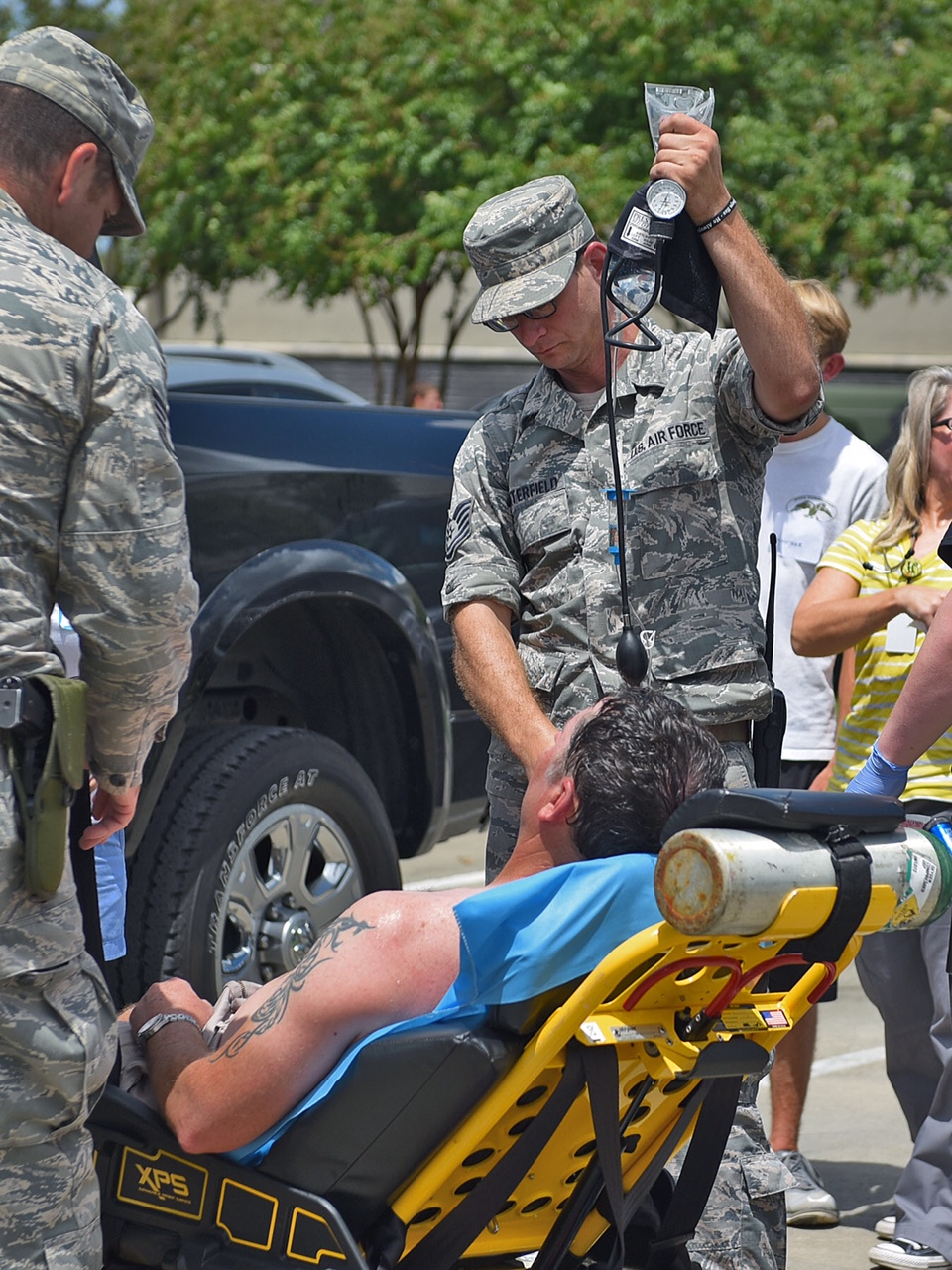
Heat stroke treatment at Baton Rouge during 2016 Louisiana floods

Heat illness is a spectrum of disorders due to increased body temperature. It can be caused by either environmental conditions or by exertion. It includes minor conditions such as heat cramps, heat syncope, and heat exhaustion as well as the more severe condition known as heat stroke. It can affect any or all anatomical systems. Heat illnesses include: heat stroke, heat exhaustion, heat syncope, heat edema, heat cramps, heat rash, heat tetany.

Prevention includes avoiding medications that can increase the risk of heat illness, gradual adjustment to heat, and sufficient fluids and electrolytes.

== Classification ==
A number of heat illnesses exist including:

- Heat stroke - Defined by a body temperature of greater than 40 °C (104 °F) due to environmental heat exposure with lack of thermoregulation. Symptoms include dry skin, rapid, strong pulse and dizziness.
- Heat exhaustion - Can be a precursor of heatstroke; the symptoms include heavy sweating, rapid breathing and a fast, weak pulse.
- Heat syncope - Fainting or dizziness as a result of overheating.
- Heat edema - Swelling of extremities due to water retention following dilation of blood vessels in response to heat.
- Heat cramps - Muscle pains that happen during heavy exercise in hot weather.
- Heat rash - Skin irritation from excessive sweating.
- Heat tetany - Usually results from short periods of stress in intense heat. Symptoms may include hyperventilation, respiratory problems, numbness or tingling, or muscle spasms.

== Overview of diseases ==
Hyperthermia, also known as heat stroke, becomes commonplace during periods of sustained high temperature and humidity. Older adults, very young children, and those who are sick or overweight are at a higher risk for heat-related illness. The chronically ill and elderly are often taking prescription medications (e.g., diuretics, anticholinergics, antipsychotics, and antihypertensives) that interfere with the body's ability to dissipate heat.

Heat edema presents as a transient swelling of the hands, feet, and ankles and is generally secondary to increased aldosterone secretion, which enhances water retention. When combined with peripheral vasodilation and venous stasis, the excess fluid accumulates in the dependent areas of the extremities. The heat edema usually resolves within several days after the patient becomes acclimated to the warmer environment. No treatment is required, although wearing support stockings and elevating the affected legs will help minimize the edema.

Heat rash, also known as prickly heat, is a maculopapular rash accompanied by acute inflammation and blocked sweat ducts. The sweat ducts may become dilated and may eventually rupture, producing small pruritic vesicles on an erythematous base. Heat rash affects areas of the body covered by tight clothing. If this continues for a duration of time it can lead to the development of chronic dermatitis or a secondary bacterial infection. Prevention is the best therapy. It is also advised to wear loose-fitting clothing in the heat. Once heat rash has developed, the initial treatment involves the application of chlorhexidine lotion to remove any desquamated skin. The associated itching may be treated with topical or systemic antihistamines. If infection occurs a regimen of antibiotics is required.

Heat cramps are painful, often severe, involuntary spasms of the large muscle groups used in strenuous exercise. Heat cramps tend to occur after intense exertion. They usually develop in people performing heavy exercise while sweating profusely and replenishing fluid loss with non-electrolyte containing water. This is believed to lead to hyponatremia that induces cramping in stressed muscles. Rehydration with salt-containing fluids provides rapid relief. Patients with mild cramps can be given oral .2% salt solutions, while those with severe cramps require IV isotonic fluids. The many sport drinks on the market are a good source of electrolytes and are readily accessible.

Heat syncope is related to heat exposure that produces orthostatic hypotension. This hypotension can precipitate a near-syncopal episode. Heat syncope is believed to result from intense sweating, which leads to dehydration, followed by peripheral vasodilation and reduced venous blood return in the face of decreased vasomotor control. Management of heat syncope consists of cooling and rehydration of the patient using oral rehydration therapy (sport drinks) or isotonic IV fluids. People who experience heat syncope should avoid standing in the heat for long periods of time. They should move to a cooler environment and lie down if they recognize the initial symptoms. Wearing support stockings and engaging in deep knee-bending movements can help promote venous blood return.

Heat exhaustion is considered by experts to be the forerunner of heat stroke (hyperthermia). It may even resemble heat stroke, with the difference being that the neurologic function remains intact. Heat exhaustion is marked by excessive dehydration and electrolyte depletion. Symptoms may include diarrhea, headache, nausea and vomiting, dizziness, tachycardia, malaise, and myalgia. Definitive therapy includes removing patients from the heat and replenishing their fluids. Most patients will require fluid replacement with IV isotonic fluids at first. The salt content is adjusted as necessary once the electrolyte levels are known. After discharge from the hospital, patients are instructed to rest, drink plenty of fluids for 2–3 hours, and avoid the heat for several days. If this advice is not followed it may then lead to heat stroke. Consistent evidence links workplace heat exposure to higher risks of heat-related illness, reduced eGFR (AOR = 3.50, 95% CI: 1.30–9.40) resulting renal impairment, cognitive decline, and injuries (1% increase in risk per 1℃ rises in temperature).

== Symptoms ==
Increased temperatures have been reported to cause heat stroke, heat exhaustion, heat syncope, and heat cramps. Some studies have also looked at how severe heat stroke can lead to permanent damage to organ systems. This damage can increase the risk of early mortality because the damage can cause severe impairment in organ function. Other complications of heat stroke include respiratory distress syndrome in adults and disseminated intravascular coagulation. Some researchers have noted that any compromise to the human body's ability to thermoregulate would in theory increase risk of mortality. This includes illnesses that may affect a person's mobility, awareness, or behavior.

== Prevention ==
Prevention includes avoiding medications that can increase the risk of heat illness (e.g. antihypertensives, diuretics, and anticholinergics), gradual adjustment to heat, and sufficient fluids and electrolytes.

Some common medications that have an effect on thermoregulation can also increase the risk of mortality. Specific examples include anticholinergics, diuretics, phenothiazines and barbiturates.

== Epidemiology ==
Between 2000–2019 studies show approximately 489 000 heat-related deaths occur each year, with 45% of these in Asia and 36% in Europe. In Europe alone in the summer of 2022, an estimated 61 672 heat-related excess deaths occurred. High intensity heatwave events can bring high acute mortality; in 2003, 70 000 people in Europe died as a result of the June–August event. In 2010, 56 000 excess deaths occurred during a 44–day heatwave in the Russian Federation.

A 2025 study published in Nature Medicine estimated 62,775 heat-related deaths (95% confidence interval: 36,765–84,379) during the summer of 2024 across 32 European countries. The estimate was based on epidemiological models using mortality and temperature data from 654 regions.

Heat stroke is relatively common in sports. About 2 percent of sports-related deaths that occurred in the United States between 1980 and 2006 were caused by exertional heat stroke. Football in the United States has the highest rates. The month of August, which is associated with pre-season football camps across the country, accounts for 66.3% of exertion heat-related illness time-loss events. Heat illness is also not limited geographically and is widely distributed throughout the United States. An average of 5946 persons were treated annually in US hospital emergency departments (2 visits/ 100,00 population) with a hospitalization rate of 7.1%. Most commonly males are brought in 72.5% and persons 15–19 years of age 35.6% When taking into consideration all high school athletes, heat illness occurs at a rate of 1.2 per 100,000 kids. When comparing risk by sport, Football was 11.4 times more likely than all other sports combined to be exposed to an exertional heat illness.

Between 1999 and 2003, the US had a total of 3442 deaths from heat illness. Those who work outdoors are at particular risk for heat illness, though those who work in poorly-cooled spaces indoors are also at risk. Between 1992 and 2006, 423 workers died from heat illness in the US. Exposure to environmental heat led to 37 work-related deaths. There were 2,830 nonfatal occupational injuries and illnesses involving days away from work as well, in 2015. Kansas had the highest heat related injury while on the job with a rate of 1.3 per 10,000 workers, while Texas had the most overall. Due to the much higher state population of Texas, their prevalence was only 0.4 per 10,000 or 4 per 100,000. Of the 37 deaths reported heat illnesses, 33 of the 37 occurred between the summer months of June through September. The most dangerous profession that was documented was transportation and material moving. Transportation and material moving accounted for 720 of the 2,830 reported nonfatal occupational injuries or 25.4 percent. After transportation and material moving, Production placed second followed by protective services, installation, maintenance, and repair and construction all in succession

=== Effects of climate change ===
A 2016 U.S. government report said that climate change could result in "tens of thousands of additional premature deaths per year across the United States by the end of this century." Indeed, between 2014 and 2017, heat exposure deaths tripled in Arizona (76 deaths in 2014; 235 deaths in 2017) and increased fivefold in Nevada (29 deaths in 2014; 139 deaths in 2017).

== History ==
Heat-related illnesses have been noted since early written records. Greek physician Hippocrates attributed several illnesses to excessive heat. Heat-related illnesses afflicted many military campaigns throughout history. Famously, when Alexander the Great's army crossed the Gedrosian desert, it lost two thirds of its soldiers due to heat fatigue and dehydration.

Heat illness used to be blamed on a tropical fever named calenture.

== See also ==
- Occupational heat stress
