= Heat syncope =

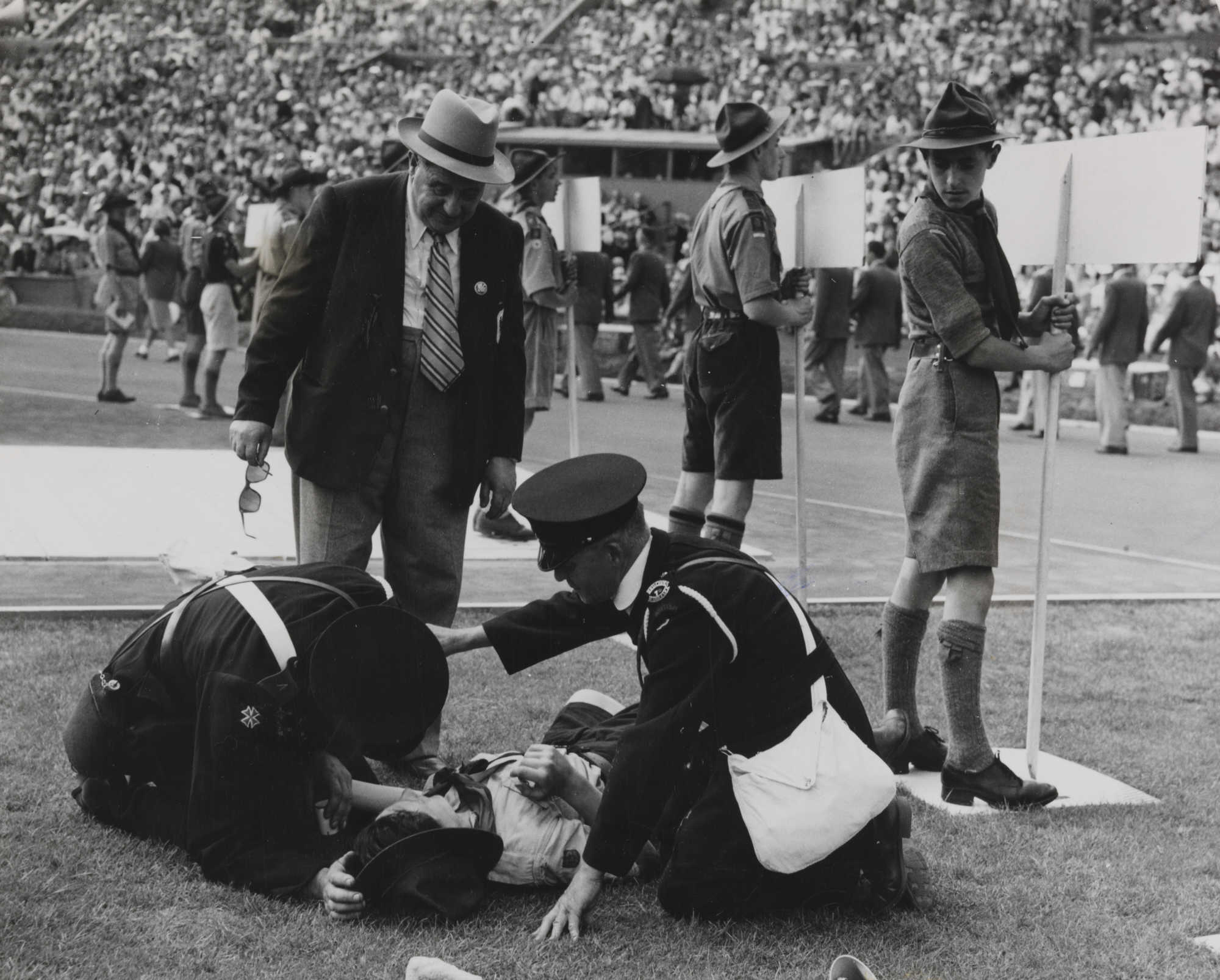
- A Boy Scout at the 1948 Olympic Games faints in the intense heat
- Specialty: Emergency medicine

Heat syncope is a type of heat illness characterized by fainting (syncope) or dizziness with or without signs of confusion as a result of overheating. Heat syncope is caused by peripheral vessel dilation, resulting in diminished blood flow to the brain and dehydration.

== Signs and symptoms ==
Symptoms of heat syncope may include faintness, dizziness, headache, increased pulse, restlessness, nausea, vomiting, pale/clammy skin, and brief loss of consciousness.

== Causes ==
Heat syncope occurs in a warm environment when blood pressure is lowered as the body dilates (widens) arterioles (small blood vessels) in the skin to radiate heat. This condition occurs within five days of acclimatization to higher temperatures, before the blood volume expands. The result is less blood to the brain, causing light-headedness and fainting when a person stands up quickly or stands for a long period of time. Those who perform strenuous work outside in warm climates are at particular risk.

== Diagnosis ==
The diagnosis of heat syncope is done during a physical examination. During the physical exam the practitioner will test the blood pressure of the patient, and the pulse. If the patient is experiencing heat syncope the blood pressure will be low, and the pulse will be elevated. Observation of excess sweating will also be a key sign. Finally, the practitioner will ask questions figuring out the history of the patient's symptoms. If the patient developed symptoms while engaging in physical activity and high temperatures it will then be a true case of heat syncope.

== Prevention ==
Physical activity in extremely hot weather should be avoided. If a person starts to experience over heating, and symptoms of heat syncope, they should move or be moved to a shaded or cool area. It is also recommended to avoid alcoholic beverages in hot weather, because they cause dehydration which may worsen symptoms. Finally, drinking plenty of water with electrolytes is imperative when engaging in physical activity in hot weather.

== Treatment ==
The basic treatment for heat syncope is like that for other types of fainting: the patient is positioned in a seating or supine position with legs raised. Water containing salt, or another drink containing electrolytes, is administered slowly, and the patient is moved to a cooler area, such as the shade.

The affected person should rest and recover, because heat syncope can lead to heat stroke or heat exhaustion.
