= Heat edema =

- Other names: Heat oedema
- Specialty: Dermatology

Heat edema is a cutaneous condition characterized by dependent edema from vasodilatory pooling. Heat causes the blood vessels to expand (dilate), so body fluid moves into the hands or legs by gravity.

The balance of salt in the body is also a risk factor for heat edema. If salt loss is less than normal, the increased salt level draws fluid into the hands and legs.

Older adults have an increased risk of heat edema, especially if they have other medical conditions that affect their circulation.

People visiting hot climates from colder climates may also have an increased risk of heat edema.

== See also ==
- Heat illness
- List of cutaneous conditions
