= Heat stroke =

Condition caused by excessive exposure to high temperatures

- Other names: Sun-stroke, siriasis
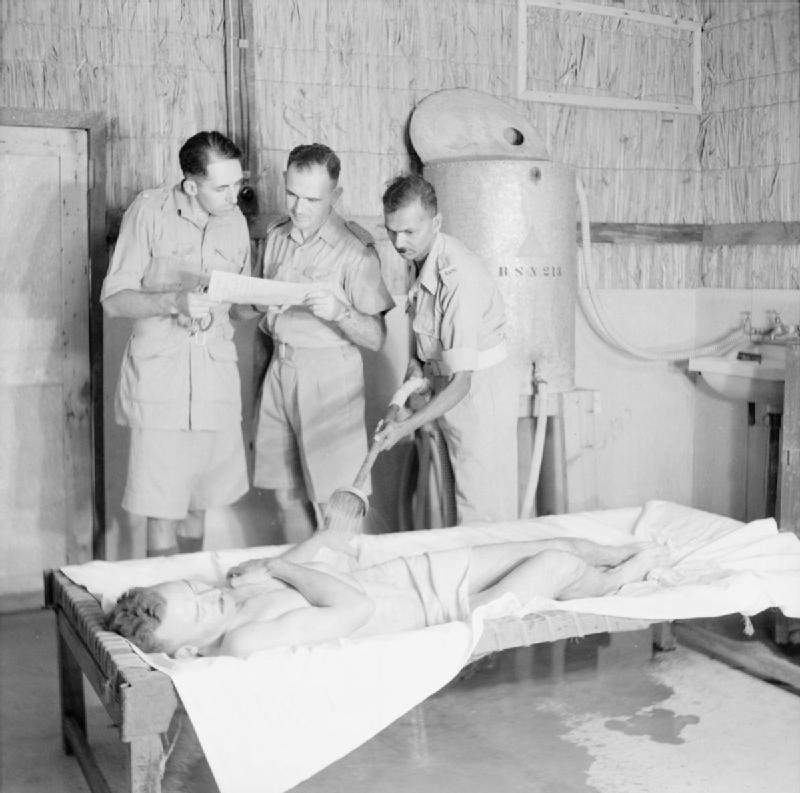
- A person being cooled down with water spray, one of the treatments for heat stroke, in Iraq in 1943
- Specialty: Emergency medicine
- Symptoms: High body temperature, red, dry or damp skin, headache, dizziness, confusion, nausea
- Complications: Seizures, rhabdomyolysis, kidney failure
- Duration: 1-2 days in the hospital (typical recovery period); 2 months to a year (complete recovery period range)
- Types: Classic, exertional
- Causes: High external temperatures, physical exertion
- Risk factors: Extremes of age, heat waves, high humidity, certain drugs, heart disease, skin disorders
- Diagnostic method: Based on symptoms
- Differential diagnosis: Neuroleptic malignant syndrome, malaria, meningitis
- Treatment: Rapid cooling, supportive care
- Prognosis: Risk of death <5% (exercise induced), 21-65% among hospitalized patients (non-exercise induced)
- Deaths: > 600 per year (US)

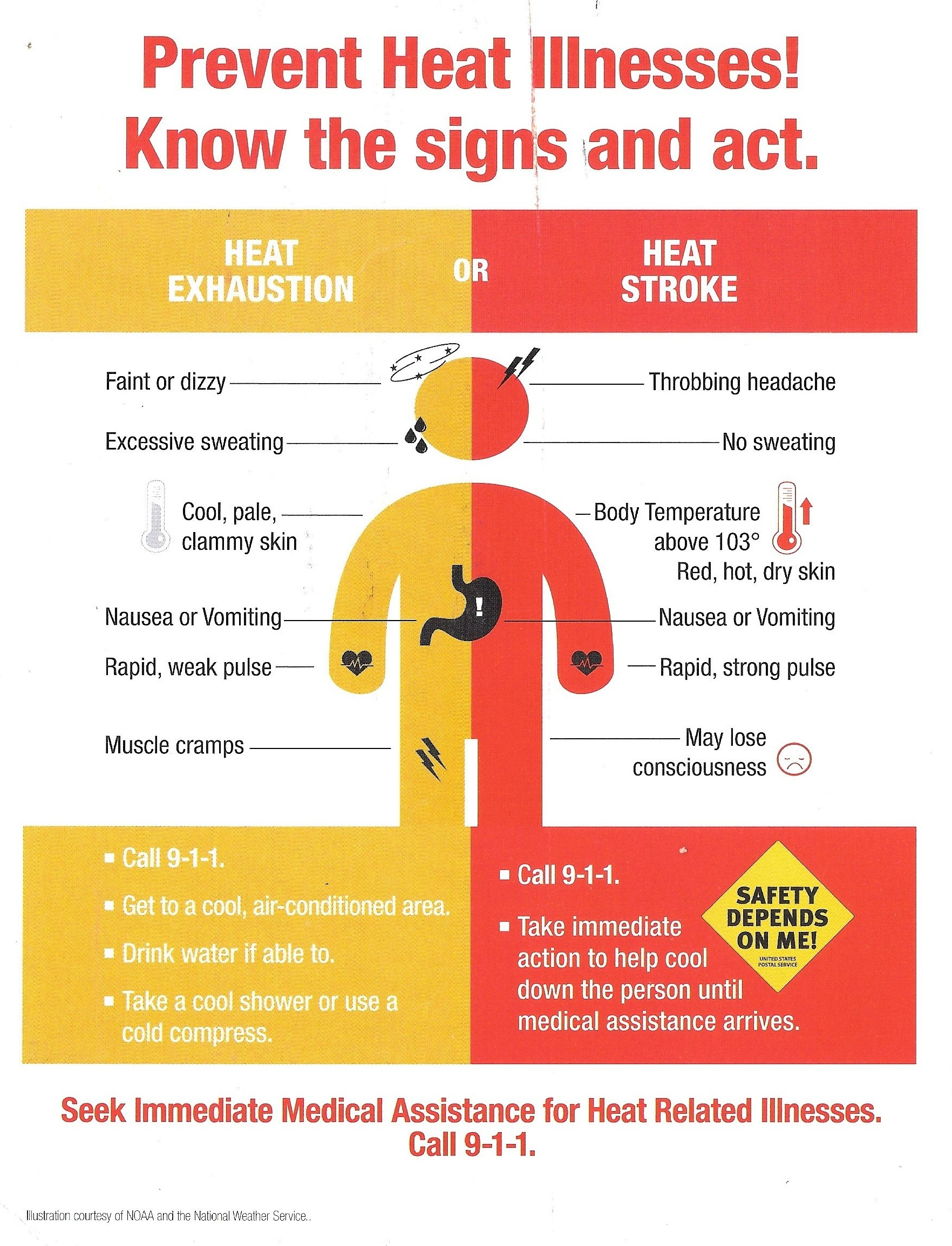
Difference between heat stroke and heat exhaustion

Heat stroke or heatstroke, also known as sun-stroke, is a severe heat illness that results in a body temperature greater than 40.0 °C (104.0 °F), along with red skin, headache, dizziness, and confusion. Sweating is generally present in exertional heatstroke, but not in classic heatstroke. The start of heat stroke can be sudden or gradual. Heatstroke is a life-threatening condition due to the potential for multi-organ dysfunction, with typical complications including seizures, rhabdomyolysis, or kidney failure.

Heat stroke occurs because of high external temperatures and/or physical exertion. It usually occurs under preventable prolonged exposure to extreme environmental or exertional heat. However, certain health conditions can increase the risk of heat stroke, and patients, especially children, with certain genetic predispositions are vulnerable to heatstroke under relatively mild conditions.

Preventive measures include drinking sufficient fluids and avoiding excessive heat. Treatment is by rapid physical cooling of the body and supportive care. Recommended methods include spraying the person with water and using a fan, putting the person in ice water, or giving cold intravenous fluids. Adding ice packs around a person is beneficial but does not by itself achieve the fastest possible cooling.

Heat stroke results in more than 600 deaths a year in the United States. Rates increased between 1995 and 2015. Purely exercise-induced heat stroke, though a medical emergency, tends to be self-limiting (the patient stops exercising from cramp or exhaustion) and fewer than 5% of cases are fatal. Non-exertional heatstroke is a much greater danger: sometimes even a healthy person, if left in a heatstroke-inducing environment without medical attention, may continue to deteriorate to the point of death. Between 21% and 65% of those hospitalized with heat stroke die in the hospital.

== Signs and symptoms ==
Heat stroke generally presents with a hyperthermia of greater than 40 °C (104 °F) in combination with disorientation. There is generally a lack of sweating in classic heatstroke, while sweating is generally present in exertional heatstroke.

Early symptoms of heat stroke include behavioral changes, confusion, delirium, dizziness, weakness, agitation, combativeness, slurred speech, nausea, and vomiting. In some individuals with exertional heatstroke, seizures and sphincter incontinence have also been reported. Additionally, in exertional heat stroke, the affected person may sweat excessively. Rhabdomyolysis, which is characterized by skeletal muscle breakdown with the products of muscle breakdown entering the bloodstream and causing organ dysfunction, is seen with exertional heatstroke.

If treatment is delayed, patients could develop vital organ damage, unconsciousness and even organ failure. In the absence of prompt and adequate treatment, heatstroke can be fatal.

== Causes ==
Heat stroke occurs when thermoregulation is overwhelmed by a combination of excessive metabolic production of heat (exertion), excessive heat in the physical environment, and insufficient or impaired heat loss, resulting in an abnormally high body temperature. Substances that inhibit cooling and cause dehydration such as alcohol, stimulants, medications, and age-related physiological changes predispose to so-called "classic" or non-exertional heat stroke (NEHS), most often in elderly and infirm individuals in summer situations with insufficient ventilation.

Young children have age specific physiologic differences that make them more susceptible to heat stroke including an increased surface area to mass ratio (leading to increased environmental heat absorption), an underdeveloped thermoregulatory system, a decreased sweating rate and a decreased blood volume to body size ratio (leading to decreased compensatory heat dissipation by redirecting blood to the skin).

=== Exertional heat stroke ===
Exertional heat stroke (EHS) can happen in young people without health problems or medications – most often in athletes, outdoor laborers, or military personnel engaged in strenuous hot-weather activity or in first responders wearing heavy personal protective equipment. In environments that are not only hot but also humid, it is important to recognize that humidity reduces the degree to which the body can cool itself by perspiration and evaporation. For humans and other warm-blooded animals, excessive body temperature can disrupt enzymes regulating biochemical reactions that are essential for cellular respiration and the functioning of major organs.

=== Cars ===
When the outside temperature is 21 °C (70 °F), the temperature inside a car parked in direct sunlight can quickly exceed 49 °C (120 °F). Young children or elderly adults left alone in a vehicle are at particular risk of succumbing to heat stroke. "Heat stroke in children and in the elderly can occur within minutes, even if a car window is opened slightly." As these groups of individuals may not be able to open car doors or to express discomfort verbally (or audibly, inside a closed car), their plight may not be immediately noticed by others in the vicinity. In 2018, 51 children in the United States died in hot cars, more than the previous high of 49 in 2010.

Dogs are even more susceptible than humans to heat stroke in cars, as they cannot produce whole-body sweat to cool themselves. Leaving the dog at home with plenty of water on hot days is recommended instead, or, if a dog must be brought along, it can be tied up in the shade outside the destination and provided with a full water bowl.

== Pathophysiology ==
The pathophysiology of heat stroke involves an intense heat overload followed by a failure of the body's thermoregulatory mechanisms. More specifically, heat stroke leads to inflammatory and coagulation responses that can damage the vascular endothelium and result in numerous platelet complications, including decreased platelet counts, platelet clumping, and suppressed platelet release from bone marrow.

Growing evidence also suggests the existence of a second pathway underlying heat stroke that involves heat and exercise-driven endotoxemia. Although its exact mechanism is not yet fully understood, this model theorizes that extreme exercise and heat disrupt the intestinal barrier by making it more permeable and allowing lipopolysaccharides (LPS) from gram-negative bacteria within the gut to move into the circulatory system. High blood LPS levels can then trigger a systemic inflammatory response and eventually lead to sepsis and related consequences like blood coagulation, multi-organ failure, necrosis, and central nervous system dysfunction.

== Diagnosis ==
Heat stroke is a clinical diagnosis, based on signs and symptoms. It is diagnosed based on an elevated core body temperature (usually above 40 degrees Celsius), a history of heat exposure or physical exertion, and neurologic dysfunction. However, high body temperature does not necessarily indicate that heat stroke is present, such as with people in high-performance endurance sports or with people experiencing fevers. In others with heatstroke, the core body temperature is not always above 40 degrees Celsius. Therefore, heat stroke is more accurately diagnosed based on a constellation of symptoms rather than just a specific temperature threshold. Tachycardia (or a rapid heart rate), tachypnea (rapid breathing) and hypotension (low blood pressure) are common clinical findings. Those with classic heat stroke usually have dry skin, whereas those with exertional heat stroke usually have wet or sweaty skin.

A core body temperature (such as a rectal temperature) is the preferred method for monitoring body temperature in the diagnosis and management of heat stroke as it is more accurate than peripheral body temperatures (such as an oral or axillary temperatures).

Other conditions which may present similarly to heat stroke include meningitis, encephalitis, epilepsy, drug toxicity, severe dehydration, and certain metabolic syndromes such as serotonin syndrome, neuroleptic malignant syndrome, malignant hyperthermia and thyroid storm.

== Prevention ==
The risk of heat stroke can be reduced by observing precautions to avoid overheating and dehydration. Light, loose-fitting clothes will allow perspiration to evaporate and cool the body. Wide-brimmed hats in light colors help prevent the sun from warming the head and neck. Vents on a hat will help cool the head, as will sweatbands wetted with cool water. Strenuous exercise should be avoided during hot weather, especially in the sun peak hours. Strenuous exercise should also be avoided if a person is ill and exercise intensity should match one's fitness level. Avoiding confined spaces (such as automobiles) without air-conditioning or adequate ventilation.

During heat waves and hot seasons further measures that can be taken to avoid classic heat stroke include staying in air conditioned areas, using fans, taking frequent cold showers, and increasing social contact and well being checks (especially for the elderly or disabled persons).

In hot weather, people need to drink plenty of cool liquids and mineral salts to replace fluids lost from sweating. Thirst is not a reliable sign that a person needs fluids. A better indicator is the color of urine. A dark yellow color may indicate dehydration.

Some measures that can help protect workers from heat stress include:

- Know signs/symptoms of heat-related illnesses.
- Block out direct sun and other heat sources.
- People should drink fluids often, even if they are not thirsty.
- Wear lightweight, light-colored, loose-fitting clothes.
- Avoid beverages containing alcohol or caffeine.

== Treatment ==
Treatment of heat stroke involves rapid mechanical cooling along with standard resuscitation measures.

The body temperature must be lowered quickly via conduction, convection, or evaporation. During cooling, the body temperature should be lowered to less than 39 degrees Celsius, ideally less than 38–38.5 degrees Celsius.

In the field, the person should be moved to a cool area, such as indoors or to a shaded area. Clothing should be removed to promote heat loss through passive cooling. Conductive cooling methods such as ice-water immersion should also be used, if possible. Evaporative and convective cooling by a combination of cool water spray or cold compresses with constant air flow over the body, such as with a fan or air-conditioning unit, is also an effective alternative.

In hospital, mechanical cooling methods include ice water immersion, infusion of cold intravenous fluids, placing ice packs or wet gauze around the person, and fanning. Aggressive ice-water immersion remains the gold standard for exertional heat stroke and may also be used for classic heat stroke. This method may require the effort of several people and the person should be monitored carefully during the treatment process. Immersion should be avoided for an unconscious person but, if there is no alternative, it can be applied with the person's head above water. A rapid and effective cooling usually reverses concomitant organ dysfunction.

Immersion in very cold water was once thought to be counterproductive by reducing blood flow to the skin and thereby preventing heat from escaping the body core. However, research has shown that this mechanism does not play a dominant role in the decrease in core body temperature brought on by cold water.

Dantrolene, a muscle relaxant used to treat other forms of hyperthermia, is not an effective treatment for heat stroke. Antipyretics such as aspirin and acetaminophen are also not recommended as a means to lower body temperature in the treatment of heat stroke and their use may lead to worsening liver damage.

A cardiopulmonary resuscitation (CPR) may be necessary if the person goes into cardiac arrest.

The person's condition should be reassessed and stabilized by trained medical personnel. And the person's heart rate and breathing should be monitored. IV fluid resuscitation is usually needed for circulatory failure and organ dysfunction and is also indicated if rhabdomyolysis is present. In severe cases hemodialysis and ventilator support may be needed.

== Prognosis ==
In elderly people who experience classic heat stroke the mortality exceeds 50%. The mortality rate in exertional heat stroke is less than 5%.

It was long believed that heat strokes lead only rarely to permanent deficits and that convalescence is almost complete. However, following the 1995 Chicago heat wave, researchers from the University of Chicago Medical Center studied all 58 patients with heat stroke severe enough to require intensive care at 12 area hospitals between July 12 and 20, 1995, ranging in age from 25 to 95 years. Nearly half of these patients died within a year – 21 percent before and 28 percent after release from the hospital. Many of the survivors had permanent loss of independent function; one-third had severe functional impairment at discharge, and none of them had improved after one year. The study also recognized that because of overcrowded conditions in all the participating hospitals during the crisis, the immediate care – which is critical – was not as comprehensive as it should have been.

In rare cases, brain damage has been reported as a permanent sequela of severe heat stroke, most commonly cerebellar atrophy.

== Epidemiology ==
Various aspects can affect the incidence of heat stroke, including sex, age, geographical location, and occupation. The incidence of heat stroke is higher among men; however, the incidence of other heat illnesses is higher among women. The incidence of other heat illnesses in women compared with men ranged from 1.30 to 2.89 per 1000 person-years versus 0.98 to 1.98 per 1000 person-years.

Different parts of the world also have different rates of heat stroke and heat stroke deaths, but direct comparison between countries is challenging due to large differences in approaches to diagnosis and reporting. This may explain inconsistencies between comparisons based on official numbers versus model-based approaches.

During the 2003 European heatwave more than 70,000 people died of heat related illnesses, and during the 2022 European heatwave, 61,672 people died from heat related illnesses.

== Society and culture ==
In Slavic mythology, there is a personification of sunstroke, Poludnitsa (lady midday), a feminine demon clad in white that causes impairment or death to people working in the fields at midday. There was a traditional short break in harvest work at noon, to avoid attack by the demon. Antonín Dvořák's symphonic poem, The Noon Witch, was inspired by this tradition.

== Other animals ==
Heatstroke can affect livestock, especially in hot, humid weather; or if the horse, cow, sheep or other is unfit, overweight, has a dense coat, is overworked, or is left in a horsebox in full sun. Symptoms include drooling, panting, high temperature, sweating, and rapid pulse.

The animal should be moved to shade, drenched in cold water and offered water or electrolyte to drink.

== See also ==
- Hyperthermia
- Heat exhaustion
- Occupational heat stress
