= Exertion =

Physical or perceived use of energy by a person

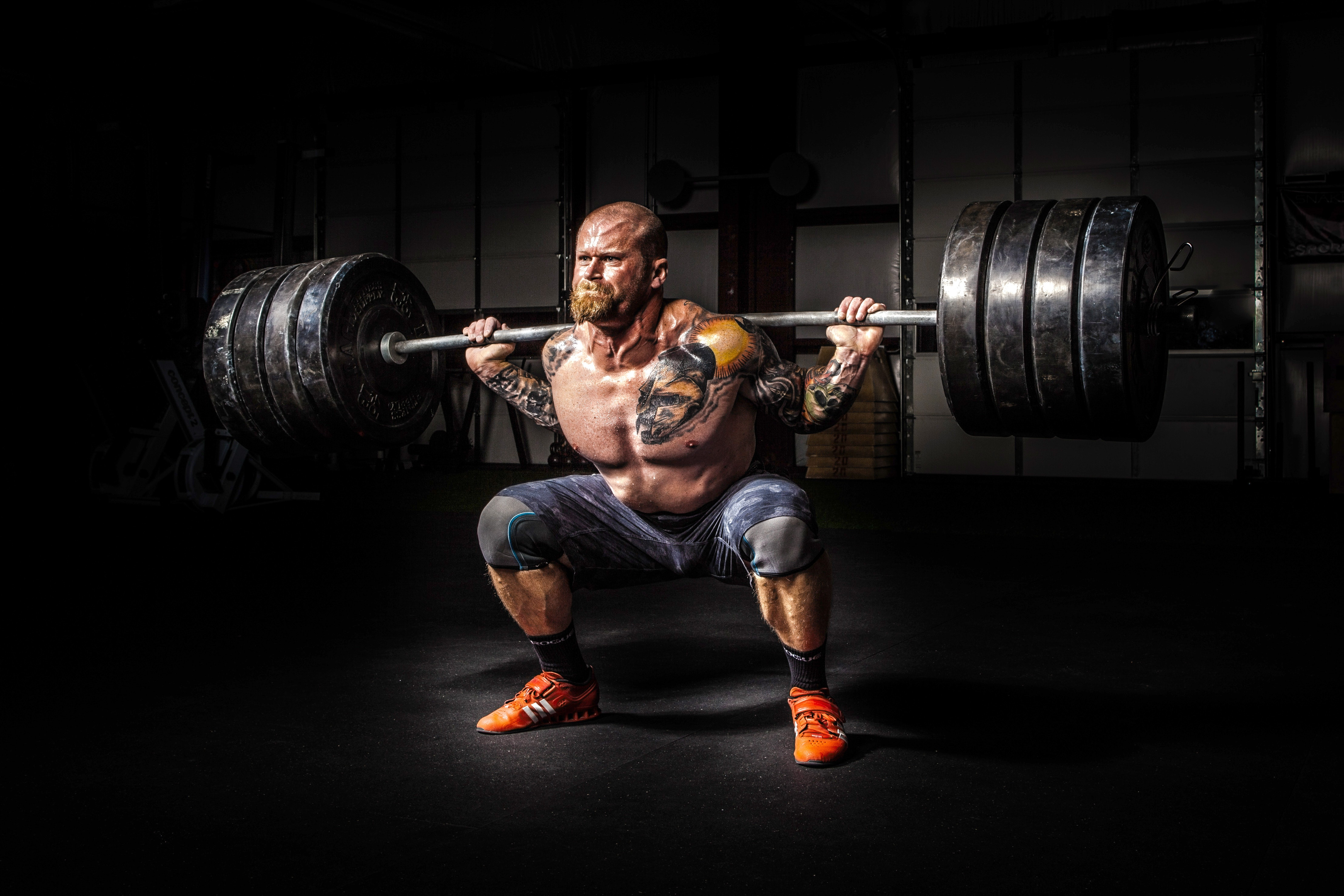
Man lifting

Exertion is the physical or perceived use of energy. Exertion traditionally connotes a strenuous or costly effort, resulting in generation of force, initiation of motion, or in the performance of work. It often relates to muscular activity and can be quantified, empirically and by measurable metabolic response.

== Physical ==
In physics, exertion is the expenditure of energy against, or inductive of, inertia as described by Isaac Newton's third law of motion. In physics, force exerted equivocates work done. The ability to do work can be either positive or negative depending on the direction of exertion relative to gravity. For example, a force exerted upwards, like lifting an object, creates positive work done on that object.

Exertion often results in force generated, a contributing dynamic of general motion. In mechanics it describes the use of force against a body in the direction of its motion (see vector).

== Physiological ==
Exertion, physiologically, can be described by the initiation of exercise, or, intensive and exhaustive physical activity that causes cardiovascular stress or a sympathetic nervous response. This can be continuous or intermittent exertion.

Exertion requires, of the body, modified oxygen uptake, increased heart rate, and autonomic monitoring of blood lactate concentrations. Mediators of physical exertion include cardio-respiratory and musculoskeletal strength, as well as metabolic capability. This often correlates to an output of force followed by a refractory period of recovery. Exertion is limited by cumulative load and repetitive motions.

Muscular energy reserves, or stores for biomechanical exertion, stem from metabolic, immediate production of ATP and increased oxygen consumption. Muscular exertion generated depends on force and velocity. Factors influencing these are muscle cross-section, muscle length, muscle fiber length, preloading of the muscle before contraction, neural activation of the muscle, muscle fiber type, and age of the muscle.

Perceived exertion can be explained as subjective, perceived experience that mediates response to somatic sensations and mechanisms. A rating of perceived exertion, as measured by the RPE-scale, or Borg scale, is a quantitative measure of physical exertion.

Often in health, exertion of oneself resulting in cardiovascular stress showed reduced physiological responses, like cortisol levels and mood, to stressors. Therefore, biological exertion is effective in mediating psychological exertion, responsive to environmental stress.

Overexertion causes more than 3.5 million injuries a year. An overexertion injury can include sprains or strains, the stretching and tear of ligaments, tendons, or muscles caused by a load that exceeds the human ability to perform the work.

== Psychological ==
In sport psychology, the perceived exertion of an exercise is how hard it seems to the person doing it. Perceived exertion is often rated on the Borg scale of 6 to 20, where 6 is complete rest and 20 is the maximum effort that an individual can endure for any period of time. Although this is a psychological measure of effort, it tends to correspond fairly well to the actual physical exertion of an exercise as well. Additionally, because a high perceived exertion can limit an athlete's ability to perform, some people try to decrease this number through strategies like breathing exercises and pranayamas and listening to music.

== See also ==
- Exercise
- Energy
- Cost
- Inertia
- Volition (psychology)
- Decision theory
- Ferdinand Tönnies [as in will (sociology)]
- Friedrich Nietzsche [as in strong-willed, drive and will (philosophy)]
- Isaac Newton
- Bionics
- Machine
- Muscular Energy
- Musculoskeletal Strength
- Physics
- Physiological stress
- Work
