= Freeman Fire =

2024 wildfire in Arizona, USA

- Part of the 2024 Arizona wildfires
- The smoke plume from the fire, as seen on July 13
- Date: July 11, 2024 –; July 18, 2024

Statistics
- Perimeter: 100% contained
- Burned area: 32,568 acres (13,180 ha; 51 sq mi; 132 km^{2})

Impacts
- Deaths: 0
- Injuries: 0

Ignition
- Cause: Lightning

The 2024 Freeman Fire was a large wildfire that rapidly burned across 32,568 acres across Pinal County, located in the U.S. state of Arizona. It began on July 11 due to a lightning strike, and was declared 100% contained on July 18.

== Progression ==
The fire started at approximately 5:10 pm MST on July 11, 15 miles northwest of Oracle, located in Pinal County. Another lightning strike a mile away produced another fire, both of which merged into the Freeman Fire. A storm system that had moved into the area contributed to the fires' rapid growth, and 12 hours after it was sparked the fire had already reached an estimated 12,000 acres in size.

By July 13, the fire had again rapidly grown to 32,568 acres, its maximum coverage. Evacuations were also prompted in the Willow Springs Ranch area due to the fire. Later the same day, containment reached 5%, and fire crews worked to keep the fire within boundaries. On July 14, crews continued to establish and secure firelines. By July 15, containment on the fire had reached 65%, and many evacuation warnings, including the one issued for the Willow Springs Ranch area, were lifted. On July 18, the fire was declared 100% contained.

== See also ==
- Wildfires in the United States during 2024
- Park Fire, a large wildfire in California the same year
- Adams Fire
- Wildcat Fire
