= Waterman Fire =

2024 wildfire in Arizona, USA

- Part of the 2024 Arizona wildfires
- Burned vegetation from the fire on July 25
- Date: July 25, 2024 –; July 30, 2024

Statistics
- Perimeter: 100% contained
- Burned area: 3,059 acres (1,238 ha; 5 sq mi; 12 km^{2})

Impacts
- Deaths: 0
- Injuries: 0

Ignition
- Cause: Lightning

The 2024 Waterman Fire was a wildfire that burned across 3,059 acres in Yavapai County, located in the U.S. state of Arizona. It started due to lightning on July 25, 2024, and was declared 100% contained on July 30.

== Progression ==
The fire started on July 25 after a lightning strike, and by 5:30 pm MST, the fire had grown to 300 acres. Multiple aircraft were assigned to drop retardant on the fire, but due to storm winds were ineffective. By 9:00 pm the same day, the fire had rapidly grown to an estimated 1,618 acres, and crews continued to work on the construction of a fireline. By the morning of July 26, crews had continued to work on securing firelines, and the fire did not gain acreage. Late on July 27, activity from the fire began to flare up again, covering 2,954 acres by 9:00 pm. Containment on the fire reached 10% around this time, as crews continued to maintain established firelines.

By July 28, the fire had reached its peak size, covering 3,059 acres. Containment on the fire also reached 35% as retardant drops were carried out against the fire. On July 29, containment had jumped to 50%, and by July 30 the fire was declared 100% contained.

== See also ==
- Wildfires in the United States during 2024
- Park Fire, a large wildfire in California the same year
- Adams Fire
- Wildcat Fire
