= Watch Fire =

2024 wildfire in Arizona, USA

- Part of the 2024 Arizona wildfires
- Map of the Watch Fire (left) and Buckhorn Fire (right)
- Date: July 10, 2024 –; July 17, 2024

Statistics
- Perimeter: 100% contained
- Burned area: 2,162 acres (875 ha; 3 sq mi; 9 km^{2})

Impacts
- Deaths: 0
- Injuries: 0
- Structures destroyed: 21 homes, 13 structures

Ignition
- Cause: Suspected arson

The 2024 Watch Fire was a destructive wildfire that burned 2,162 acres across Gila and Graham counties, located in the U.S. state of Arizona. The fire began on July 10, and was declared 100% contained by July 17. It was the 9th fire to burn more than 2,000 acres as part of the 2024 Arizona wildfire season.

== Progression ==
The fire started on July 10, from human causes. By July 15, the fire had reached 2,162 acres in size along tribal lands in Gila and Graham counties. On July 16, containment on the fire was declared to be at 81%, and 185 crews were assigned to the fire. By July 17, containment on the fire had reached 100%, and SET alerts remained in place for multiple areas near the fire. In ll, the fire destroyed an estimated 21 homes and 13 non-occupied structures in the San Carlos Apache Indian Reservation area.

== Aftermath ==
=== Cause ===
The fire was believed to have been started as a result of arson in the San Carlos Apache Indian Reservation area. A tribe member, Keanu Dude, was arrested and accused of lighting the fire.

== See also ==
- Wildfires in the United States during 2024
- Park Fire, a large wildfire in California the same year
- Adams Fire
- Wildcat Fire
