= Gold Fire (2020) =

2020 wildfire in Northern California

- Part of the 2020 Lassen County wildfires
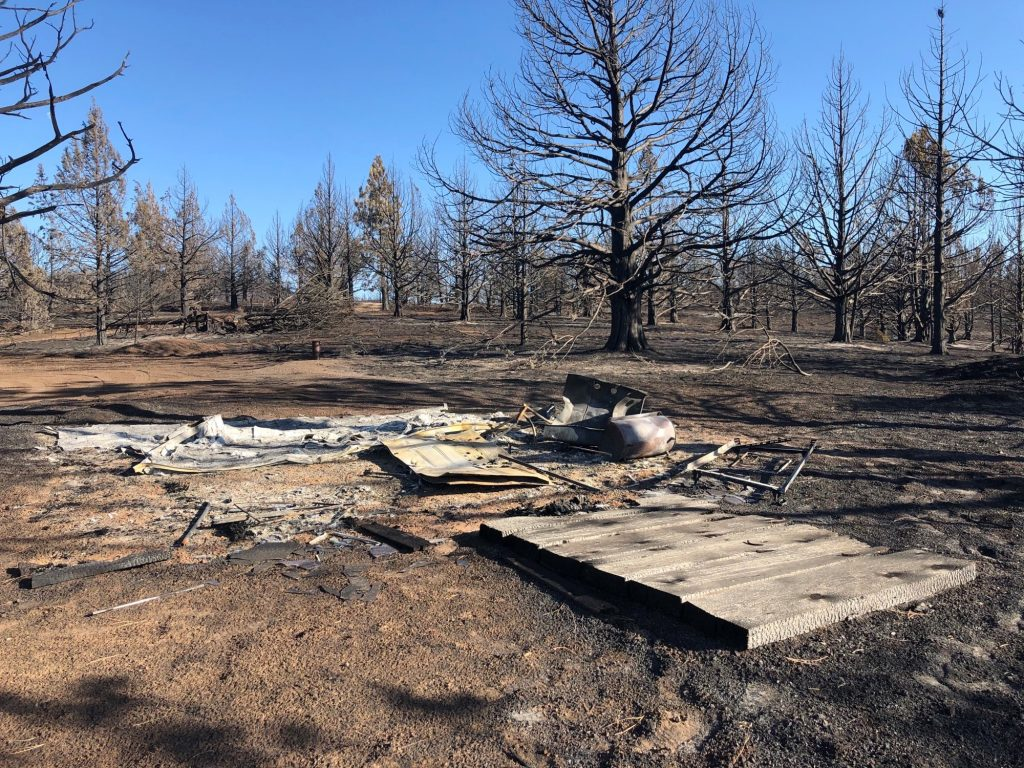
- A structure destroyed by the fire near Adin
- Date: July 20, 2020 –; August 12, 2020
- Location: Adin, Lassen County, California
- Coordinates: 41.11037°N 120.923293°W

Statistics
- Burned area: 21,870 acres (8,850 ha)

Impacts
- Injuries: 2
- Structures lost: 13 structures destroyed and 5 damaged

Ignition
- Cause: Under investigation

Map
- Location in California

Location of Gold Fire

The Gold Fire was a wildfire that burned during the 2020 California wildfire season south of Adin along Highway 139 in Lassen County, California in the United States. Igniting on Monday, July 20, on the east side of Highway 139 in rural landscape, the fire expanded to 21,870 acres (8,850 ha) and destroyed thirteen structures while also damaging an additional five.

== See also ==
- 2020 California wildfires
