= Cohasset, California =

Cohasset
- census-designated place
- Location of Cohasset in Butte County, California.

- Location in California
- Coordinates: 39°55′32″N 121°43′52″W
- Country: United States
- State: California
- County: Butte

Area
  - Total: 25.05 sq mi (64.87 km^{2})
  - Land: 25.05 sq mi (64.87 km^{2})
  - Water: 0 sq mi (0.00 km^{2}) 0%
- Elevation: 2,828 ft (862 m)

Population (2020)
  - Total: 830
  - Density: 33/sq mi (12.8/km^{2})
- Time zone: UTC-8 (Pacific (PST))
  - Summer (DST): UTC-7 (PDT)
- ZIP Code: 95973
- Area codes: 530, 837
- GNIS feature IDs: 1655909; 2612478

Cohasset (formerly known as Keefers Ridge and North Point) is a census-designated place in Butte County, California, United States, approximately 17.7 miles (28.5 km) north-northeast of Chico. The name derives from the Algonquian Indian language and means "long rocky place", as in Massachusetts. The population was 830 at the 2020 census.

The town is a mountain community at 2,828 feet (862 m) above mean sea level. It sits on Cohasset Ridge: an eleven-mile (18 km) ridge running roughly southwest-to-northeast. The U.S. Geological Survey feature ID is 1655909 and NAD27 coordinates for the community are 39°55′32″N 121°43′48″W. The ZIP Code for the community is 95973, which is shared with about seven other nearby towns, and the area code 530.

In late July 2024, the town of Cohasset was significantly impacted and partially destroyed by the Park Fire with no recorded fatalities. The town has since been repopulated.

The primary airport is the Chico Municipal Airport.

== History ==
In the mid-19th century the local lumber and farming operations began, prior to which the Maidu inhabited the area for many generations. By the early 20th century, Cohasset was famous for its high quality apples. Today, they are better known for peaceful country living, the Annual Cohasset Bazaar, and the beauty of the Cohasset Ridge. A post office operated at Cohasset from 1888 to 1920. The early lumbermen designated the ridge after the pineries. A school district was formed July 16, 1878 to provide a place of learning for the children of the growing number of pioneer families and was given the name of North Point District. The entire ridge came to be known by the name of North Point. In 1887, the ridge residents requested the United States Government to establish a post office there, to be named North Point. The Post Office Department concurred in the need of a postal facility but balked at the requested name. There were already too many stations in the country with either North or Point in their names so it was requested that another name be selected. For a name selecting committee two young ladies of the ridge, Miss Marie Wilson and Miss Electa Welch (the school teacher) were appointed and they chose the name Cohasset, meaning "City of Pines" in the Algonquin Indian language. There was a precedent for this in Cohasset, Massachusetts, a charming resort town of pines and rocks located on the seacoast southeast of Boston. The new name was satisfactory and the first Cohasset, California post office was established February 20, 1888.

== Demographics ==
Historical population
Census	Pop.	Note	%±
2010	847		—
2020	830		−2.0%
U.S. Decennial Census; 2010

Cohasset first appeared as a census designated place in the 2010 U.S. census.

=== 2020 census ===
As of the 2020 census, Cohasset had a population of 830. The population density was 33.1 inhabitants per square mile (12.8/km^{2}). The age distribution was 17.6% under the age of 18, 5.3% aged 18 to 24, 20.4% aged 25 to 44, 29.5% aged 45 to 64, and 27.2% who were 65 years of age or older. The median age was 50.3 years. For every 100 females there were 115.6 males, and for every 100 females age 18 and over there were 117.1 males age 18 and over.

0.0% of residents lived in urban areas, while 100.0% lived in rural areas.

The whole population lived in households, no one lived in non-institutionalized group quarters and no one was institutionalized. There were 368 households, of which 18.8% had children under the age of 18 living in them. Of all households, 47.8% were married-couple households, 6.0% were cohabiting couple households, 29.1% were households with a male householder and no spouse or partner present, and 17.1% were households with a female householder and no spouse or partner present. About 34.5% of all households were made up of individuals and 16.6% had someone living alone who was 65 years of age or older. The average household size was 2.26. There were 220 families (59.8% of all households).

There were 427 housing units at an average density of 17.0 units per square mile (6.6 units/km^{2}), of which 13.8% were vacant. The homeowner vacancy rate was 1.6% and the rental vacancy rate was 9.8%. Of occupied units, 85.3% were owner-occupied and 14.7% were occupied by renters.

Racial composition as of the 2020 census
Race	Number	Percent
White	727	87.6%
Black or African American	3	0.4%
American Indian and Alaska Native	14	1.7%
Asian	2	0.2%
Native Hawaiian and Other Pacific Islander	1	0.1%
Some other race	20	2.4%
Two or more races	63	7.6%
Hispanic or Latino (of any race)	58	7.0%

== Government ==
=== State ===
The citizens of Cohasset, as constituents of California's 3rd Assembly District, are represented by Vacant in the California State Assembly, and as members of California's 1st Senate District, are represented by Republican Megan Dahle in the California State Senate.

=== Federal ===
Cohasset is in California's 1st congressional district, represented by Republican James Gallagher.

== Climate ==
According to the Köppen Climate Classification system, Cohasset has a warm-summer Mediterranean climate, abbreviated "Csa" on climate maps.

== Education ==
Cohasset is served by the Chico Unified School District.
