= 2020 Lassen County wildfires =

2020 wildfire sub-season that burned in Lassen County

2020 Lassen County, California wildfires
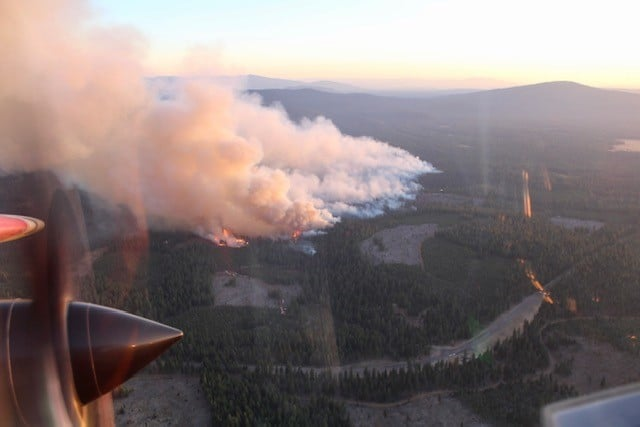
- The Hog Fire near Susanville

Statistics
- Total fires: 7
- Total area: 203,296

Impacts
- Injuries: 3
- Structures destroyed: 100

The 2020 Lassen County wildfire season included seven large wildfires that burned entirely or in part in Lassen County. A total of 203,296 acres (82,271 ha) (or 203,296 acres (318 mi^{2})) of land was burned in Lassen County, making it one of the larger clusters of fires in the 2020 California wildfire season.

== The fires ==
=== Hog Fire ===
The Hog Fire was a wildfire that broke out on July 18, 2020, from an unknown cause near Susanville, the county seat of Lassen County, California. Within the first few days, the fire quickly spread to over 8,000 acres. Hog grew to a mere 9,564 acres, before it was fully extinguished on August 17, 2020.

=== Gold Fire ===
The Gold Fire was a wildfire that burned south of Adin along Highway 139. Igniting on Monday, July 20, on the east side of Highway 139 in rural landscape, the fire expanded to 21,870 acres (8,850 ha) and destroyed thirteen structures while also damaging an additional five.

=== North Fire ===
The North Fire burned in Washoe and Lassen counties. The fire triggered evacuations in Washoe County, and shut off roads in California including US 395.

=== Loyalton Fire ===
The Loyalton Fire was a wildfire burning in Lassen, Plumas, and Sierra counties, caused by lightning strikes in August 2020. During the fire, the National Weather Service issued the first ever fire whirl warning in US history.

=== Sheep Fire ===
Ignited by lightning on August 17, the Sheep Fire burned in Lassen and Plumas counties. Originally part of the North Complex, it burned 29,570 acres (11,967 ha), mostly in the Plumas and Lassen National Forests, before being fully contained on September 9, 2020.

=== W-5 Cold Springs fire ===
The W-5 Cold Springs was a lightning-sparked fire burning in Lassen, Modoc and Washoe counties. The fire grew up to 84,817 acres (34,324 ha) before it was contained on September 14, making it the largest 2020 Lassen County fire.

=== Laura 2 Fire ===
The November 17th Laura 2 Fire was the most destructive fire in the 2020 Lassen County fire season, despite its relatively small size. It burned 2,800 acres (1,133 ha) and destroyed 48 structures before its containment on November 24.

== Table and Map ==
Name	County (other than Lassen)	Acres	Start date	Containment date	Notes	Ref
Hog	n/a	9,564	July 18	August 8	2 structures destroyed	
Gold	n/a	22,634	July 20	August 8	13 structures destroyed; 5 structures damaged; 2 firefighters injured in burnover	
North	Washoe, NV	6,882	August 2	August 10	6,882 acres in total, of which approximately 4,105 acres burned in Washoe County, Nevada	
Loyalton	Plumas, Sierra	47,029	August 15	September 14	Lightning-sparked, Caused National Weather Service to issue first ever Fire Tornado Warning; 5 homes, 6 outbuildings destroyed	
Sheep	Plumas	29,570	August 17	September 9	Lightning-sparked, 26 structures destroyed, 1 injury	
W-5 Cold Springs	Modoc, Washoe, NV	84,817	August 18	September 14	Lightning-sparked. Fire spread eastward into Washoe County, Nevada.	
Laura 2	n/a	2,800	November 17	November 24	Unknown cause; 48 structures destroyed; 4 structures damaged	

Location of Lassen County wildfires
