= 2024 Arizona wildfires =

Natural disasters in the USA

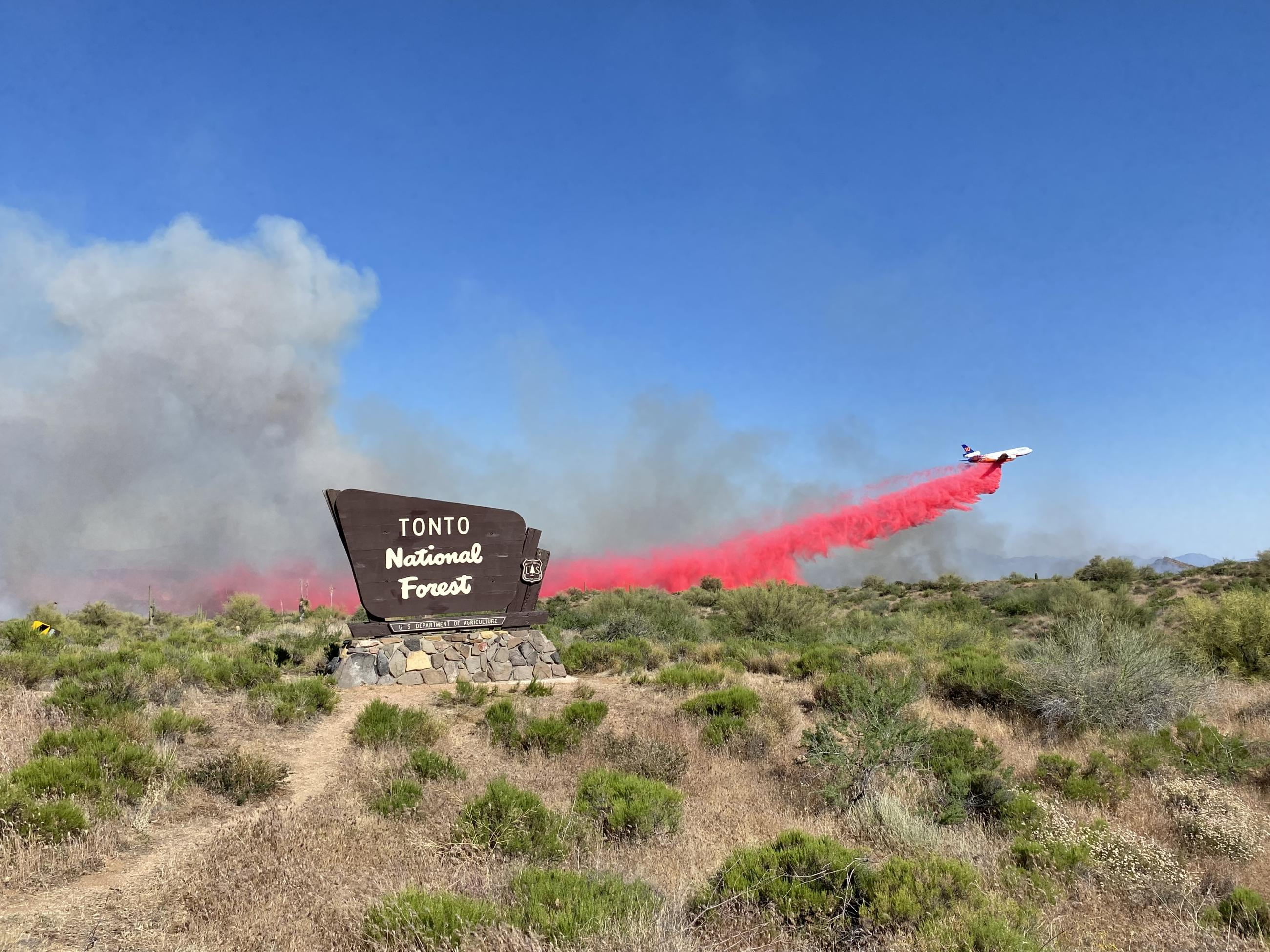
- The Wildcat Fire, which burned in the Tonto National Forest

The 2024 Arizona wildfire season is an ongoing series of wildfires that have been burning throughout the U.S. state of Arizona.

== Background ==
Historically, while peak fire times were from June to July before monsoon season, wildfires now occur at any time of year. Wildfire conditions are influenced by heavy drought and dryness in the state, but snowmelt in the mountains leads to vegetation growth. With decreasing precipitation in spring, fires tend to start earlier. Monsoons affect fire conditions, with above-average monsoons hindering fires and below-average allowing them to spread. Dryness common in Arizona quickly dries out vegetation, allowing dangerous fire conditions.

== Summary ==
In the winter from 2023-24, above-average precipitation lead to vegetation growth, especially in Maricopa and Pinal counties, providing fuel for the fires. This contributed to a 54% increase in wildfires in Pinal County from last year. Above-average spring temperatures led to an early start to wildfires in Central and Southern Arizona, but snowpack in the northern portion of the state held off fires. A late, below-average monsoon and warm, dry conditions continued into fall and winter months, allowing fires to last late into the year. September and October were some of the hottest months in Arizona. Prolonged warm and dry conditions that lasted into December contributed to the Horton Fire.

The dry vegetation was influenced by a drought that had come from previous years. The number of fires and acreage had increased since previous years, including a 15% increase of wildfires since 2023.

== List of wildfires ==
The following is a list of fires that burned more than 1,000 acres (400 ha), or produced significant structural damage or casualties.

Name	County	Acres	Start date	Containment date (Note: Containment means that fire crews have established and secured control lines around the fire's perimeter. These lines are artificial barriers, like trenches or cleared vegetation, designed to stop the fire's spread, or natural barriers like rivers. Containment reflects progress in managing the fire but does not necessarily mean the fire is starved of fuel, under control, or put out.)	Notes	Ref
Wolf	Coconino	9,896	April 29	May 23		
Flying Bucket	Maricopa	2,795	May 6	May 12		
Toyo	Gila and Graham	1,778	May 10	May 24		
Wildcat	Maricopa	14,402	May 18	June 3		
Rocky	Graham	1,597	May 23	May 27		
Refuge	Yuma and La Paz	1,041	May 26	July 10	While not fully contained, local fire crews have allowed the fire to smolder for the coming weeks.	
Spring	Maricopa	4,097	June 1	June 5		
Adams	Maricopa	5,029	June 2	June 10		
Top	Gila	3,292	June 9	June 18		
Foote	Greenlee	4,558	June 14	September 3		
Sayer	Coconino	1,049	June 16	June 23		
Boulder View	Maricopa	3,711	June 27	July 16	Human-caused (estimated cause) Most people within the range of 2–3 miles had to evacuate. Multiple emergency alerts were sent out (approx: 7+) (more accurate confirmed: 5+) during the first few weeks of the active fire.	
Lockett	Coconino	2,782	June 29		Lightning-caused	
Buckhorn	Graham	1,006	July 10	August 10		
Watch	Gila & Graham	2,162	July 10	July 17	Destroyed 21 buildings and 13 other structures, caused by suspected arson	
Freeman	Pinal	32,568	July 11	July 18		
Rabbit	Coconino	3,016	July 17	July 26		
Rock	Gila	4,317	July 22	75% contained		
Sand Stone	Maricopa	27,390	July 25	August 22		
Waterman	Yavapai	3,059	July 25	July 31		
Skeleton	Yavapai	24,034	August 3	August 24		
Clair	Maricopa	2,170	August 4	August 22		
Bartlett	Maricopa	6,161	August 4	August 22		
Sheep	Gila	2,483	August 6	August 22		
Element	Mohave	5,364	August 6	August 19		
Preacher	Gila	3,161	August 29	0% contained		
Black Mesa 2	Yavapai	2,600	August 31	September 8		
Long Gulch	Yavapai	1,100	August 31	September 23		
West	Gila	1,782	September 1	0% contained		
Wood	Pinal	7,211	September 1	September 13		
Siphon	Pinal	15,527	September 10	September 27		
Point	Maricopa	4,168	September 10	0% contained		
Brigade	Coconino	1,812	September 21	October 9		

== See also ==
- 2024 United States wildfires
