= Orange Skies Day =

September 9, 2020; climate event in Bay Area caused by wildfires

2020 San Francisco Orange Skies Day
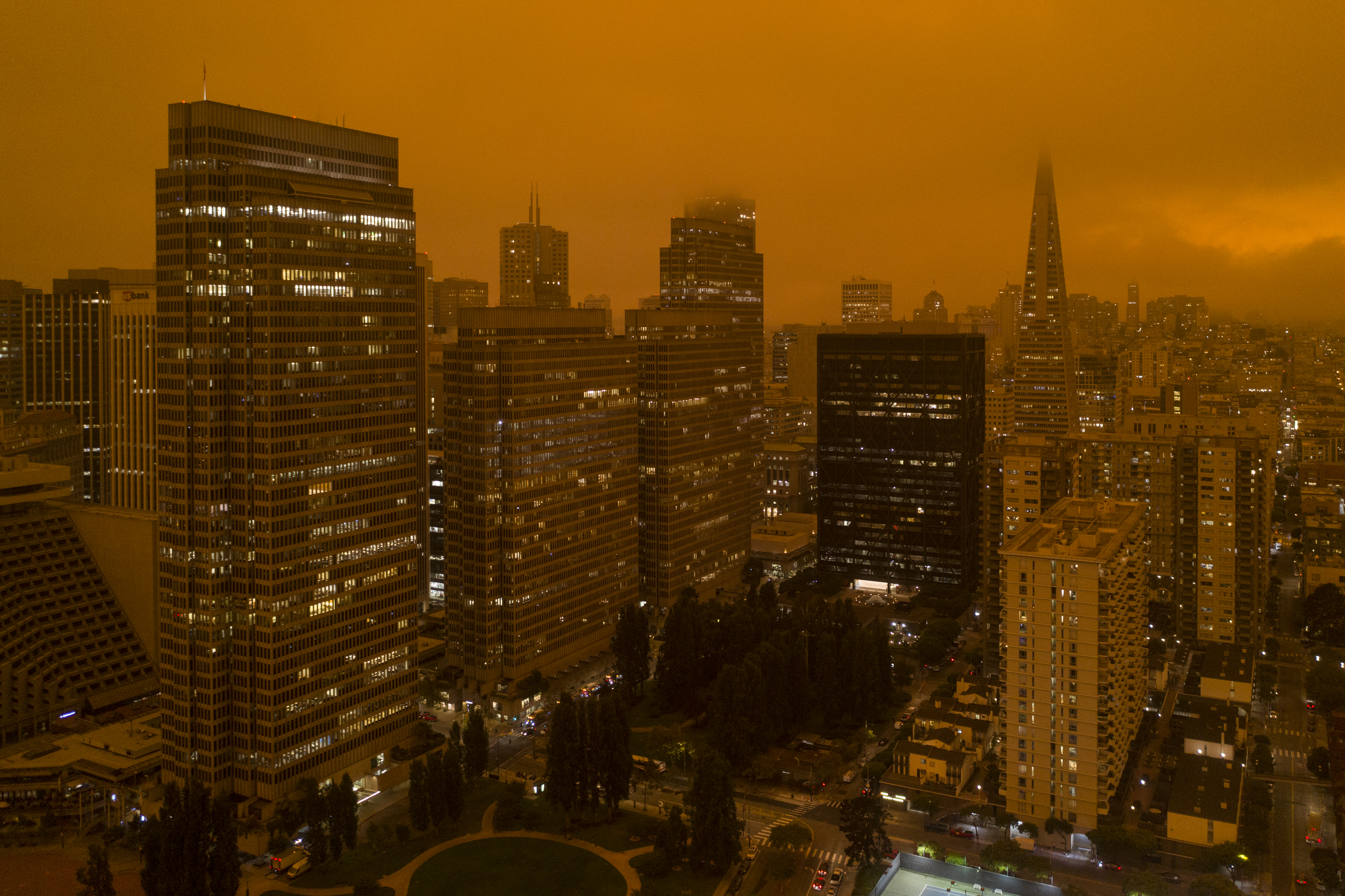
- Smoke from the North Complex Fire mixed with fog to create an orange hue in the sky
- Date: September 9, 2020
- Location: Bay Area, California, United States
- Cause: Smoke from the North Complex Fire

Orange Skies Day was a climatological event that occurred in the San Francisco Bay Area on September 9, 2020.

The orange-colored visual array in the sky was the result of smoke from the North Complex Fire (including the Bear Fire) and more than 20 other wildfires, which burned more than 2 million acres east of the San Francisco Bay Area. This smoke scattered blue light wavelengths, which only allowed warmer colors to reach the Earth's surface.

== September 9, 2020 ==
On the early morning of September 9, 2020, the sun failed to appear. As a result, light-sensitive bridge and street lights remained alight the entire day, and drivers were recommended to keep their headlights on all day. Daniel Swain, a UCLA climate scientist, wrote that the smoke was "almost completely blocking out the sun across some portions of Northern California." In a tweet, the San Francisco Fire Department stated, "We know the smoke, darkness and orange glow is scary. It is going to get better."

The San Francisco Giants played against the Seattle Mariners under the orange skies as part of the 2020 San Francisco Giants season. The air quality on the ground was 90, so the game scheduled for that day took place as planned. They won the game 10-1.

== Responses ==
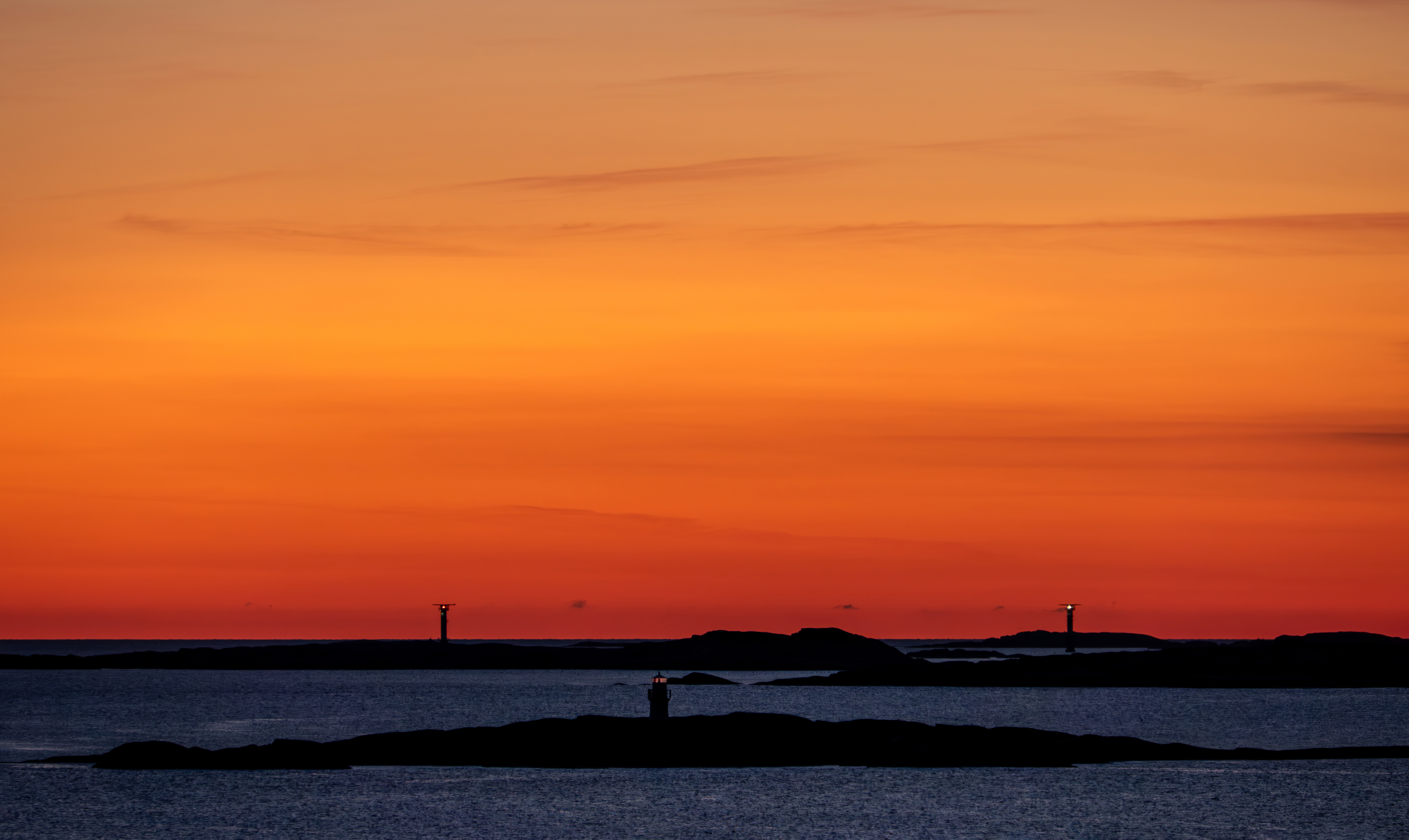
Around 16–19 September, the smoke from the fires reached as far as the Swedish west coast, where it tinted the sunsets orange. Photo of the sky looking out over the Atlantic from Lysekil, Sweden.

Public officials, such as former-President Barack Obama, attributed the event to climate change. California Governor Gavin Newsom stated, "I quite literally have no patience for climate change deniers. It's completely inconsistent, that point of view, with the reality on the ground."

In popular culture, the day was compared to the films Blade Runner 2049 and Dune. In 2022, a theatrical concept album by the San Francisco Bay Area Theatre Company titled "The Day the Sky Turned Orange" was performed at the New Roots Theatre Festival. On September 9, 2025, on the five year anniversary of the day, San Francisco Bay Area Theatre Company and Z Space world premiered the musical “The Day the Sky Turned Orange”. This musical was commissioned by San Francisco Bay Area Theatre Company and created by Rodney Earl Jackson Jr., Olivia Kuper Harris, David Michael Ott, and Julius Ernesto Rea.

== Gallery ==
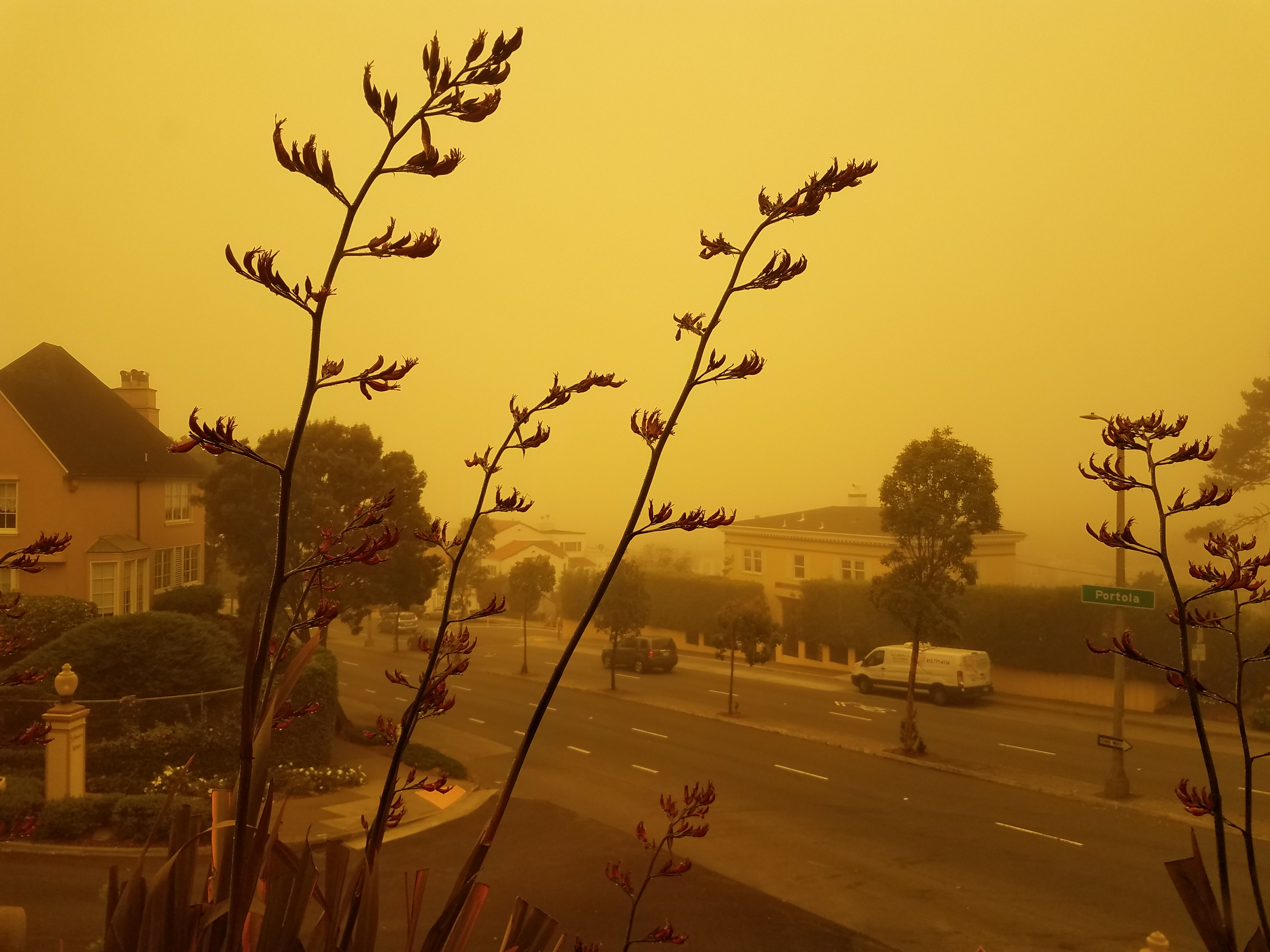
View from San Francisco, looking westbound over Portola Drive towards the Pacific Ocean.

== See also ==
- New England's Dark Day (1780)
- Chinchaga Fire (1950, Canada)
- Cedar Fire (2003, San Diego)
- 2023 Canadian wildfires
- Bridge Fire (2024, Victorville, California)
