= North Complex Fire =

2020 wildfire in Northern California

- Part of the August 2020 California lightning siege
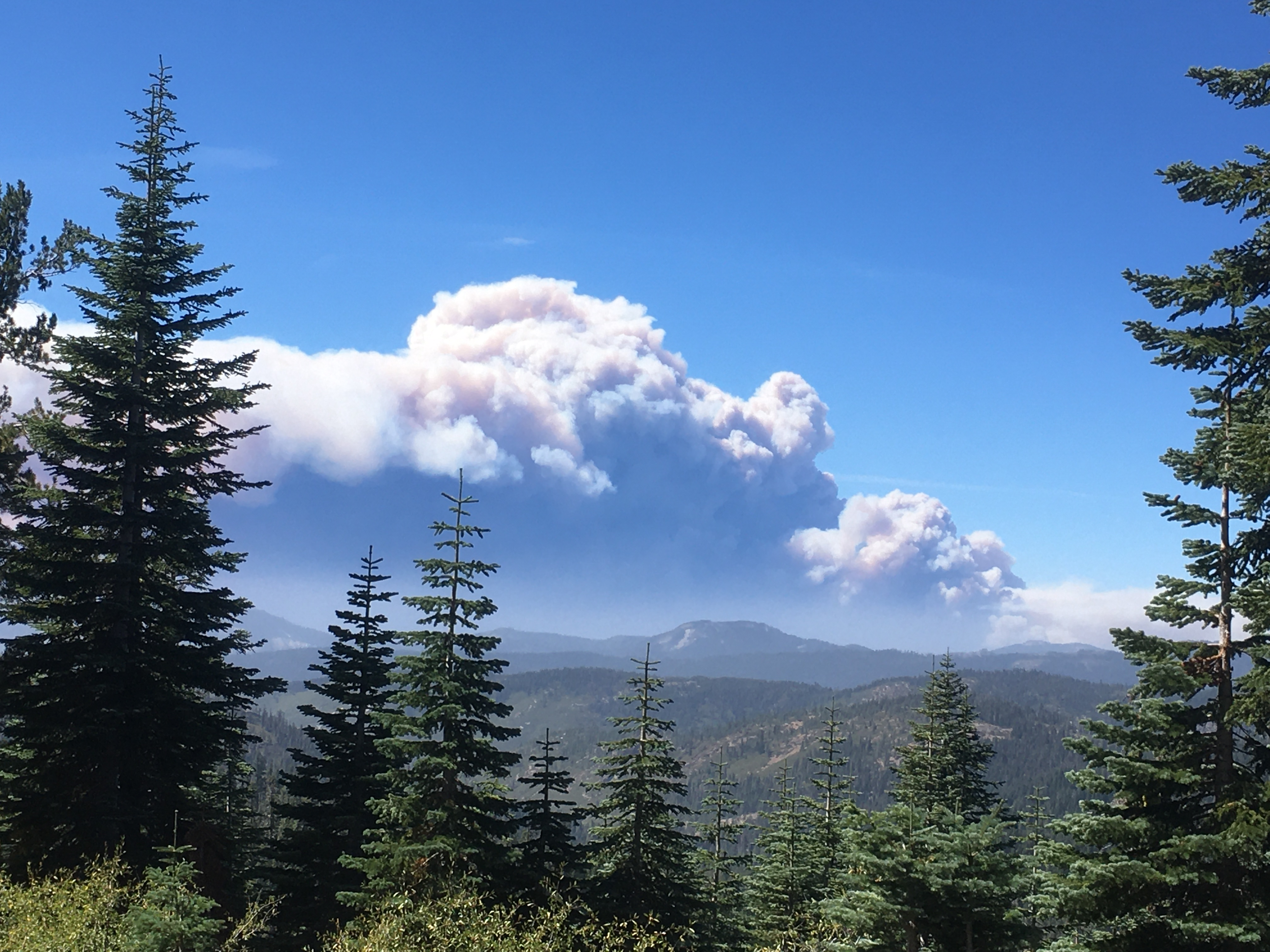
- The North Complex Fire at around 1:00 p.m. on September 8, viewed from near Sierra City
- Date: August 17 –; December 3, 2020; (109 days)
- Location: Plumas County; and Butte County, Northern California, United States
- Coordinates: 39.85°N 120.96°W

Statistics
- Burned area: 318,935 acres (129,068 ha)

Impacts
- Deaths: 16
- Injuries: 100+
- Structures lost: 2,455

Ignition
- Cause: Lightning strikes

Map
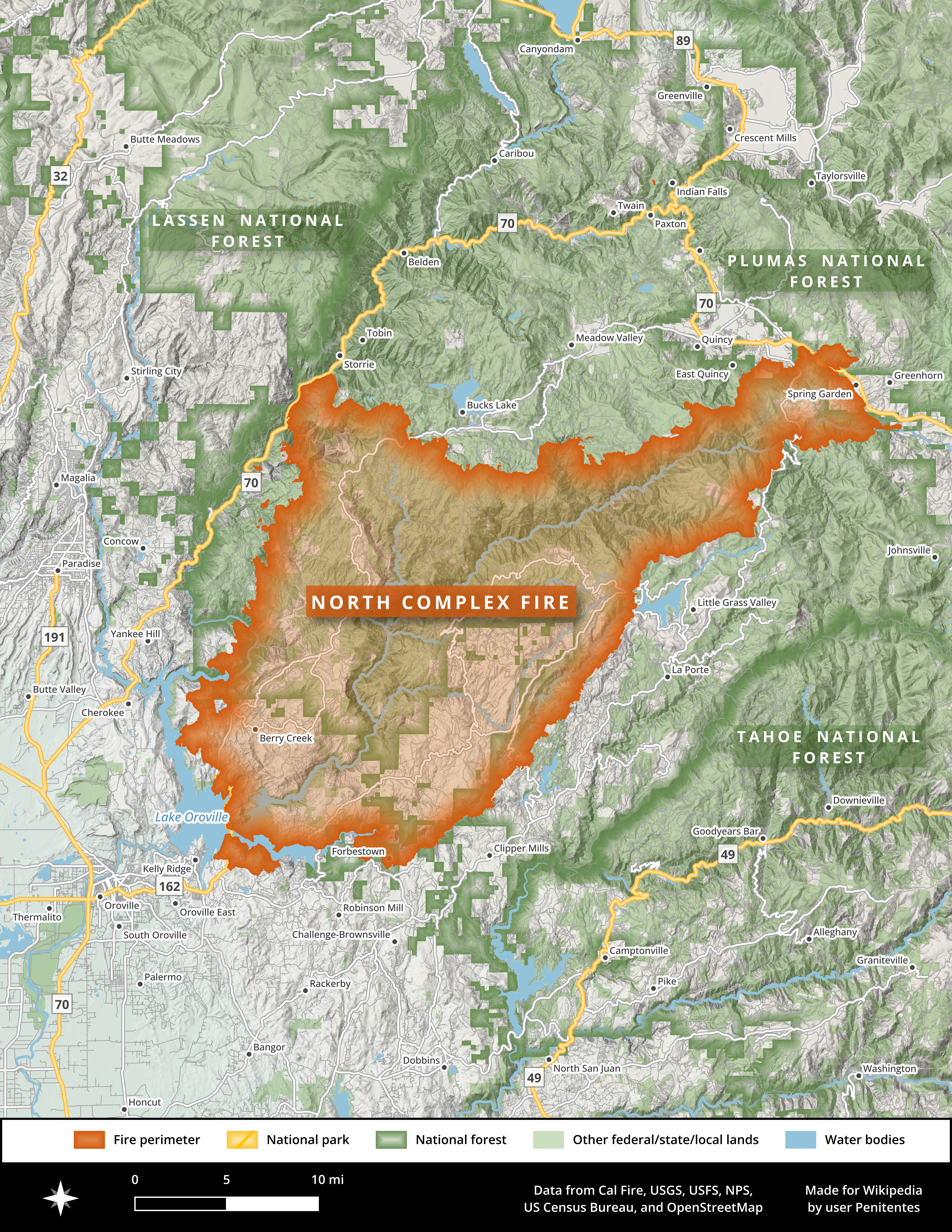
- The North Complex Fire burned southwest, from Highway 70 near Quincy to Lake Oroville

- The general location of the fire in Northern California

The North Complex Fire was a massive wildfire complex that burned in the Plumas National Forest in Northern California in the counties of Plumas and Butte. Twenty-one fires were started by lightning on August 17, 2020; by September 5, all the individual fires had been put out with the exception of the Claremont and Bear Fires, which merged on that date, and the Sheep Fire, which was then designated a separate incident. On September 8, strong winds caused the Bear/Claremont Fire to explode in size, rapidly spreading to the southwest. On September 8, 2020, the towns of Berry Creek and Feather Falls were immediately evacuated at 3:15 p.m. PDT with no prior warning. By September 9, 2020, the towns of Berry Creek and Feather Falls had been leveled, with few homes left standing. The fire threatened the city of Oroville, before its westward spread was stopped. The fire killed 16 people and injured more than 100. The complex burned an estimated 318,935 acres (129,068 ha), and was 100% contained on December 3. The fire was managed by the U.S. Forest Service in conjunction with Cal Fire, with the primary incident base in Quincy. The North Complex Fire is the eighth-largest in California's history, and was the deadliest fire in the 2020 California wildfire season.

== Progression ==
=== August 17–September 4 ===
On August 17, 2020, dry thunderstorms sparked 21 wildfires in the Plumas National Forest and Lassen National Forest, the largest of which were the Claremont and Bear Fires along the canyon of the Middle Fork Feather River. The storms came from a large plume of moisture from Tropical Storm Fausto that were carried into California, which started hundreds of wildfires simultaneously across Northern and Central California. By August 22, 16 of the original 21 fires had been contained. The Sheep Fire near Susanville was originally included as part of the North Complex, but on September 5, it was assigned to a separate incident. The Sheep Fire burned about 29,570 acres (11,970 ha), before it was fully contained on September 9.

==== Claremont Fire ====
The Claremont Fire was spotted around 9:00 a.m. PDT on August 17. The fire originated along Claremont Creek, a tributary of the Middle Fork just south of Quincy, and quickly jumped the ridge northwards towards American Valley. On August 20 an evacuation advisory was issued for East Quincy which was quickly changed to a mandatory evacuation for East Quincy and residents along Quincy-La Porte Road. On August 22 the fire jumped California State Route 70 at the Massack Rest Area southeast of Quincy. On August 23, aided by high winds, the fire began advancing rapidly east forcing Spring Garden and Greenhorn to be evacuated. The fire threatened State Route 70 and the Union Pacific Railroad tracks, shutting both down intermittently for several days.

On August 27, the Claremont Fire was at 20,697 acres (8,376 ha) and 47 percent contained. Mandatory evacuations were lifted in East Quincy, but with continued strong west winds, Greenhorn and Sloat to the east were evacuated on August 28. On August 30 crews conducted backfire operations on the eastern side of the fire and prevented it from spreading towards Spring Garden and Cromberg. On September 1 mandatory evacuations were lifted for Quincy-La Porte Road. On September 5, with fire activity much lower on the eastern sides, evacuation orders were lifted for Spring Garden, Greenhorn, Sloat and Cromberg. On the morning of August 31, the North Complex Fire was at 22,780 acres (9,220 ha), and 59 percent contained. On the morning of September 4 it had grown to 24,330 acres (9,850 ha), and containment had dropped to 49 percent.

==== Bear Fire ====
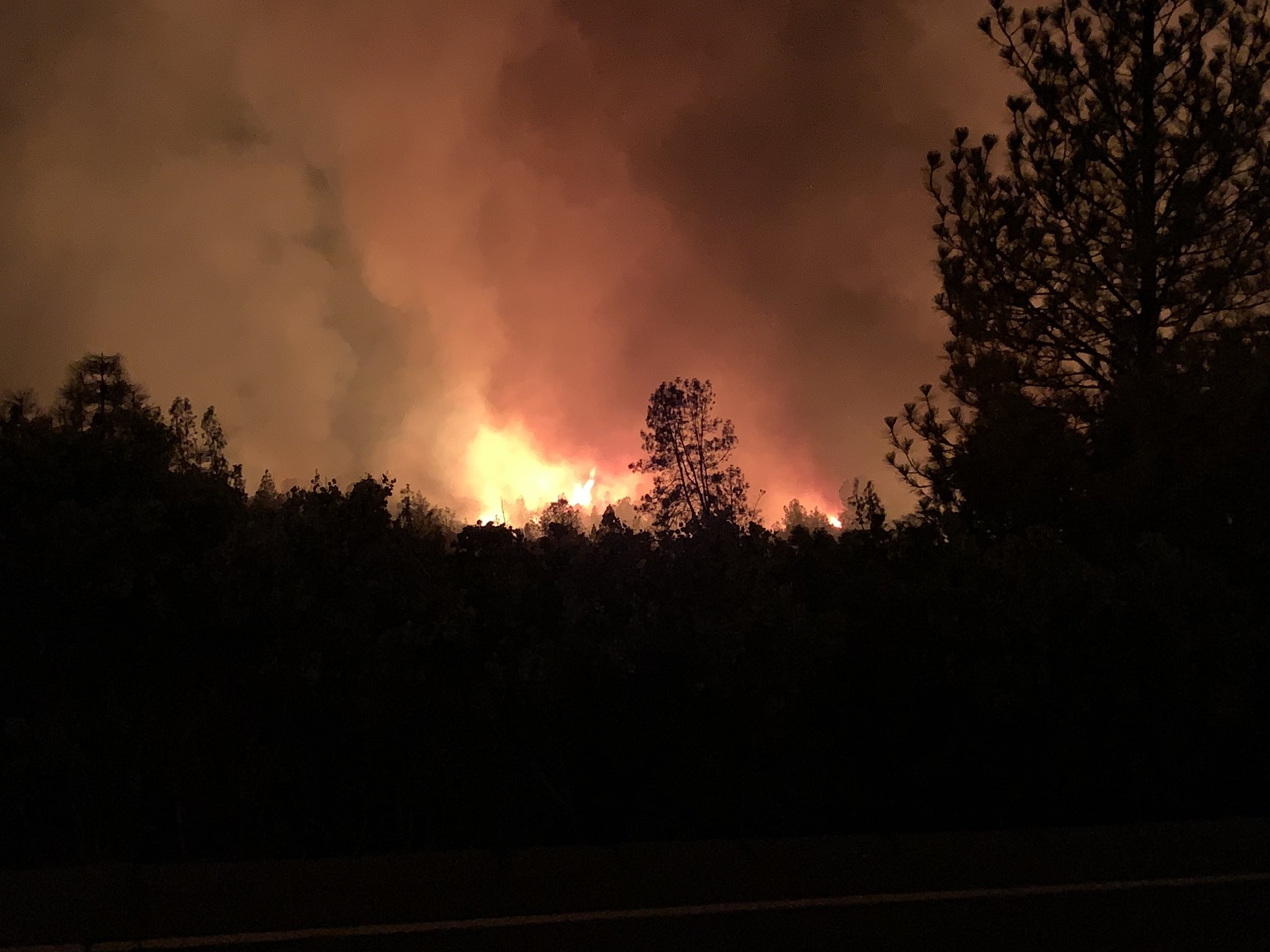
Bear Fire on Highway 162, 10 September

The Bear Fire was also spotted around 9:00 a.m. on August 17, in the Middle Fork canyon west of the Claremont Fire near the Pacific Crest Trail. The fire started in rough, roadless country along the Wild and Scenic section of the Middle Fork. An effort was made to staff the fire on August 18, but an increase in fire activity forced fire crews to withdraw. After that point, because of limited firefighting resources, the Bear Fire was left unstaffed because it wasn't immediately a threat to people or property, it was in steep, rugged terrain, and resources were scarce due to the fires burning across the state. Efforts were concentrated on the Claremont Fire. By August 23, it was at 1,661 acres (672 ha). On August 26, some areas around Bucks Lake were placed under evacuation advisory due to increased fire activity on the Bear Fire. Crews also were working on containment line to the northeast as the fire expanded slightly towards Quincy. By August 31 it had grown to 9,570 acres (3,870 ha), and was still 0 percent contained. On the morning of September 4 it was at 12,154 acres (4,919 ha), and was 29 percent contained.

=== September 5–December 3 ===
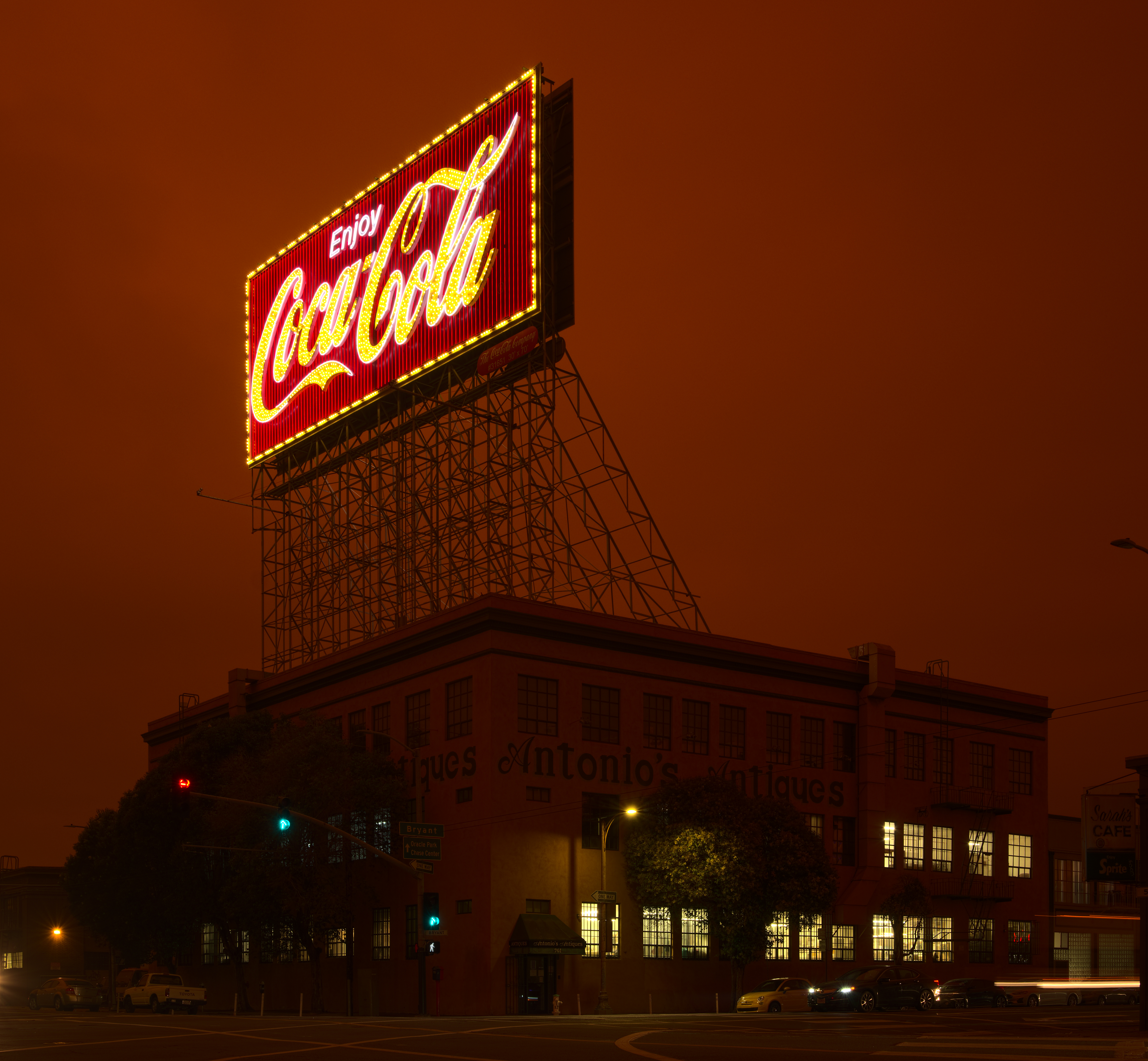
Smoke from the fire led to Orange Skies Day in San Francisco

While crews concentrated on structure protection and building containment line around the perimeter of the fires, the unpopulated area between the Claremont and Bear fires was allowed to burn naturally with the help of backfiring operations, and the two fires merged on September 5, at a combined 39,779 acres (16,098 ha). A total of 1,386 personnel were assigned to the fire. The southern boundary of the fire was mostly held along the Middle Fork, and crews worked to build secondary containment lines south of the river. Flames crossed the river in a few areas but were quickly contained.

On the morning of September 8 a dry cold front moved in, bringing strong northeast winds and threatening the incomplete containment line along the river. At about 10:00 a.m., the fire jumped the river near Horshoe Bend and began heading rapidly southwest. With winds gusting to 45 miles per hour (72 km/h), the spot fire had grown to 1,000 acres (400 ha) within an hour, and by 3:00 p.m. it had grown to more than 20,000 acres (8,100 ha). At 11:50 a.m., mandatory evacuations were issued for La Porte and Little Grass Valley Reservoir. As winds picked up throughout the day, evacuation orders were issued by 3:25 p.m. for several communities in Butte County including Feather Falls, Clipper Mills, Berry Creek, Brush Creek, Woodleaf and Forbestown, and around Miners Ranch Road and California State Route 162. Evacuation orders were also effective in Yuba County for residents along La Porte Road, New York Flat Road, and around Brownsville and New Bullards Bar Reservoir. By the afternoon of September 8 the fire had burned more than 58,000 acres (23,000 ha). At 11:00 p.m. PDT, Kelly Ridge and Copley Hills, near Lake Oroville, were evacuated, as officials predicted strong winds would lead to continuing extreme fire behavior.

On the early morning of September 9, evacuation warnings were issued for more areas around Lake Oroville, Concow and Paradise and in Plumas County, a mandatory evacuation order was issued for Bucks Lake and an evacuation advisory for Meadow Valley. As predicted, high winds continued to drive the fire rapidly downhill and southwest, traveling 20 miles (32 km) to Lake Oroville in a few hours, threatening the city of Oroville. By 8:35 a.m., the fire was estimated at more than 150,000 acres (61,000 ha). The entire town of Berry Creek was destroyed, with only 3 houses left standing in the town of 1,200. Homes were also burned in several nearby communities, such as Feather Falls. Daniel Swain, a climate scientist at University of California Los Angeles, compared the explosive wind-driven spread with the 2018 Camp Fire, which occurred just north of this area.

At 4:00 p.m. PDT on September 9, the fire had jumped the southern arm of the lake and was burning in the hills above Oroville. It had also traveled as far west as the North Fork Feather River, threatening Paradise, although the burn scar from the Camp Fire slowed fire activity. On the south, the fire reached the South Fork Feather River, burning around the north side of Little Grass Valley Reservoir and approaching Forbestown. The city of Oroville and surrounding foothill communities were under an evacuation warning. As of 5:00 p.m., at least three people were dead and twelve missing; at least 100 people were rescued. An estimated 2,000 buildings had been destroyed. On the evening of September 9, the fire was estimated at 252,163 acres (102,047 ha) 24 percent containment.

On September 10, the section of the fire that had burned into the Cal Fire protection zone was labeled as the North Complex West Zone. The approximately 70,000 acres (28,000 ha) section mostly outside of the Plumas National Forest was managed by Cal Fire. On September 10 authorities reported the number of confirmed deaths had increased to ten, and 16 people were reported missing. Due in part to a reversal of wind direction, the fire did not burn significantly more acreage on September 10. On the same day, the burn area was revised to 244,203 acres (98,825 ha), with 23 percent containment.

By September 11, winds had shifted to the southwest, blowing the fire front and smoke back over the burn area and towards Quincy. Fire activity was significantly decreased from the previous day, allowing crews to work on containment lines protecting homes around Bucks Lake and Little Grass Valley Reservoir. By the morning of September 12, the fire was at 252,313 acres (102,107 ha) and 21 percent contained. A total of 3,282 personnel were assigned to the fire.

On September 14, the fire had increased in size to 264,374 acres (106,988 ha), with most growth along the north flank of the fire. Containment was increased to 38 percent. On September 15 continued southwest winds caused the fire to jump containment lines near Red Mountain, moving northeast towards Bucks Lake. On September 16 high fire activity continued near Red Mountain, with spot fires starting in the Grizzly Lake area. The fire was also active and growing in Onion Valley south of Quincy. In the meantime, firefighters made progress on containment lines along the southeast flank of the fire, between Sly Creek Reservoir and Little Grass Valley Reservoir. The fire was at 273,335 acres (110,615 ha) and 36 percent contained.

On the morning of September 17, evacuation orders were issued for Meadow Valley and Tollgate as fire activity continued to pick up on the north side. By September 18, firefighters had extended containment lines up from Sly Creek Reservoir to Onion Valley. The spot fire at Grizzly Lake was contained, but not before burning 200 acres (81 ha). The fire was at 287,354 acres (116,288 ha), and containment was increased to 54 percent. On September 22, the North Complex reached 300,204 acres (121,488 ha), and was 75 percent contained. Most of the growth had occurred on the northwest side of the fire as it continued to expand towards Bucks Lake.

On September 27, strong sustained winds picked up once again, starting spot fires outside of containment lines, including one on French Hotel Creek. An evacuation order was issued for Pulga, Concow, Big Bend and Yankee Hill as the fire moved west towards the North Fork Feather River Canyon. By the morning of September 29, the fire was within a few hundred yards of Highway 70, which was closed between Greenville Wye (west of Quincy) and Cherokee Road (east of Oroville). The North Complex was at 308,995 acres (125,046 ha) and 76 percent contained.

On December 3, the North Complex was declared 100% contained at 318,935 acres.

== Effects ==
=== Casualties ===
Perimeter of North Complex Fire

The North Complex killed sixteen people. Fourteen were residents of Berry Creek, and two were residents of Feather Falls. The first report of fatalities came from the Butte County Sheriff, who announced the discovery of three victims of the fire on Wednesday, September 9. Seven more deaths were reported on Thursday, September 10, bringing the toll to ten people, while sixteen people remained missing. The death toll was temporarily lowered from ten to nine people on September 11 after a skeleton discovered in a burned storage shed was determined to have been an anatomical model belonging to an anthropology student, and not that of a victim.

The Butte County Sheriff's office announced the discovery of three more sets of remains on Saturday, September 12, with thirteen still missing. The discovery of two bodies was announced on Sunday, September 13, followed by another on Monday, September 14. The death toll remained at fifteen until October 28, 2020, when the Butte County Sheriff's Office announced that a 54-year-old male resident of Berry Creek had died from lingering burn injuries one week prior. Approximately twenty people were hospitalized with burn injuries.

=== Air quality ===
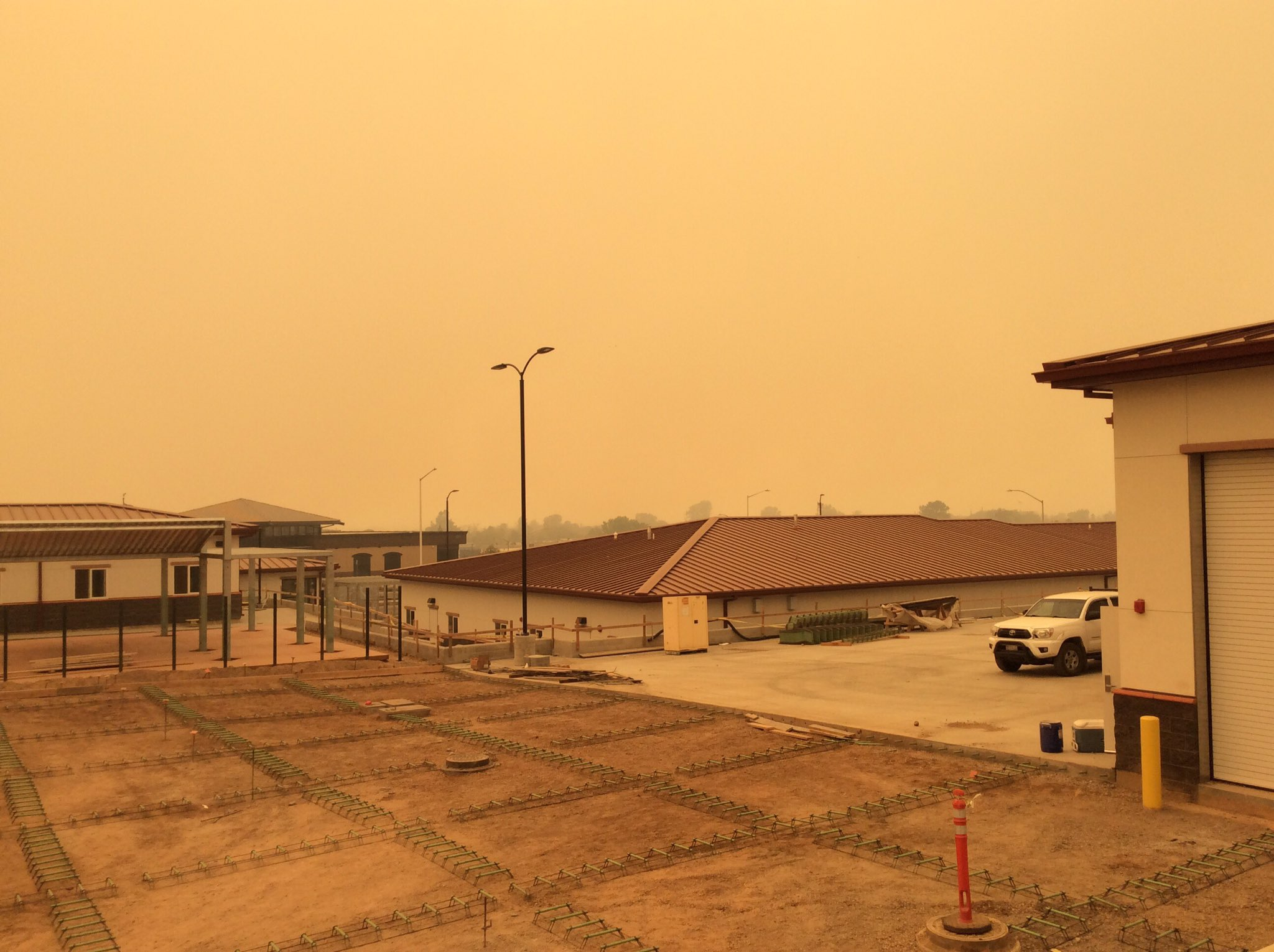
Smoke from Bear Fire in Oroville

Smoke from the fire created extremely unhealthy air conditions in Quincy and nearby communities for several weeks. After the fire grew explosively in size on September 9, smoke reached the Sacramento Valley and the San Francisco Bay area (where the effects of the smoke led to the day being referred to as Orange Skies Day) with ash falling from the sky between Danville, San Jose, and San Francisco.

=== Political response ===
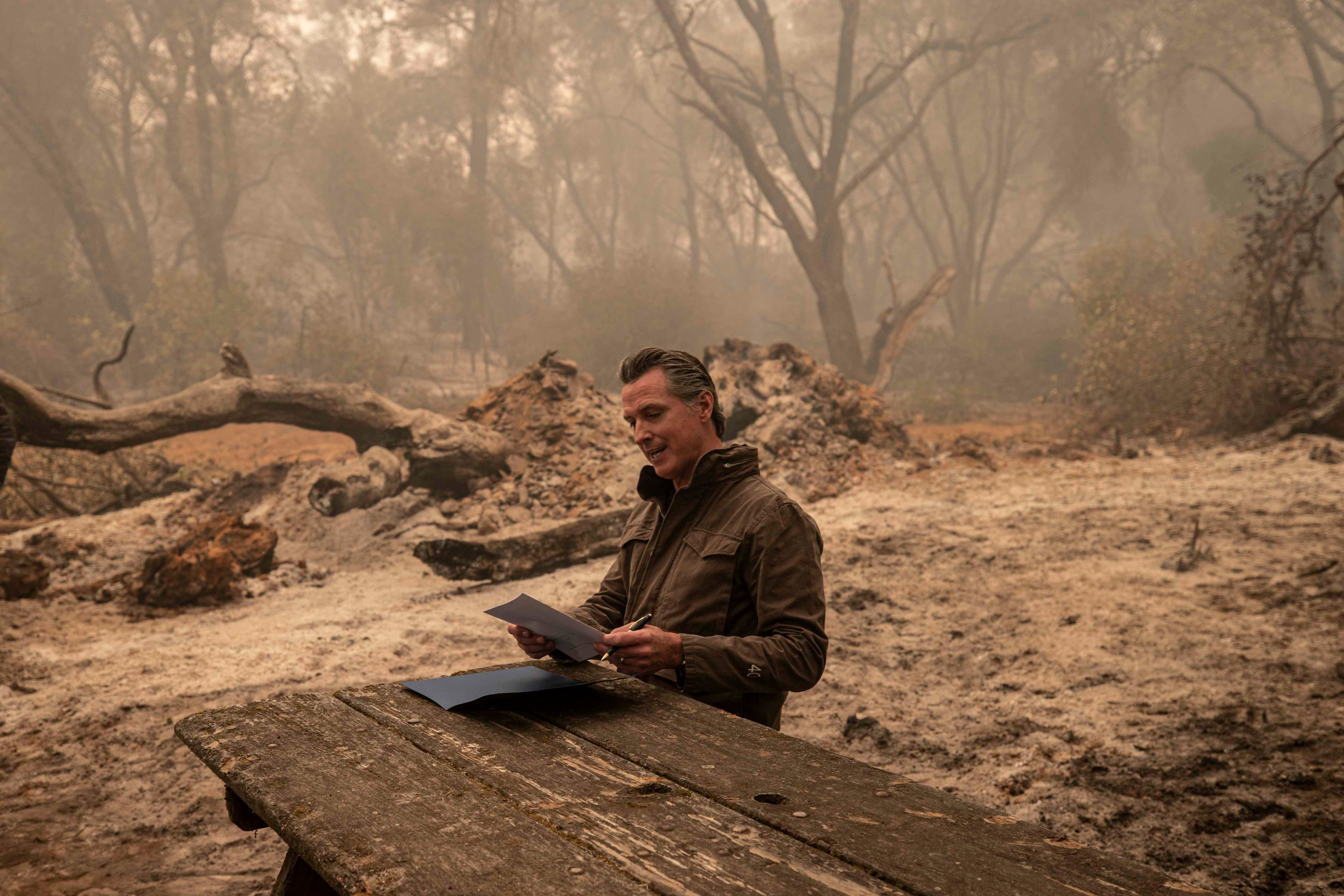
Gavin Newsom signing AB2147 in the North Complex Fire burn zone

On September 11, Governor Newsom visited the North Complex to talk about climate change and signed AB2147 into law, which allows former inmate firefighters to pursue a professional career in firefighting. He utilized the opportunity for social media.

Several Republican legislators from the region pushed back on the governor's comments following his visit. Doug LaMalfa, the House representative for California's 1st district, criticized Newsom's "audacity to come tour the North Complex and peddle his climate change agenda while offering zero solutions to alleviate the pain of our people or get these fires under control". State senator Jim Nielsen and assemblyman James Gallagher issued a press release calling Newsom's comments a deflection from "the fundamental failure to address the fuels build-up in our forests that are the cause of these devastating fires".

== See also ==
- 2020 California wildfires
