= Adams Fire =

2024 wildfire in Arizona, USA

- Part of the 2024 Arizona wildfires
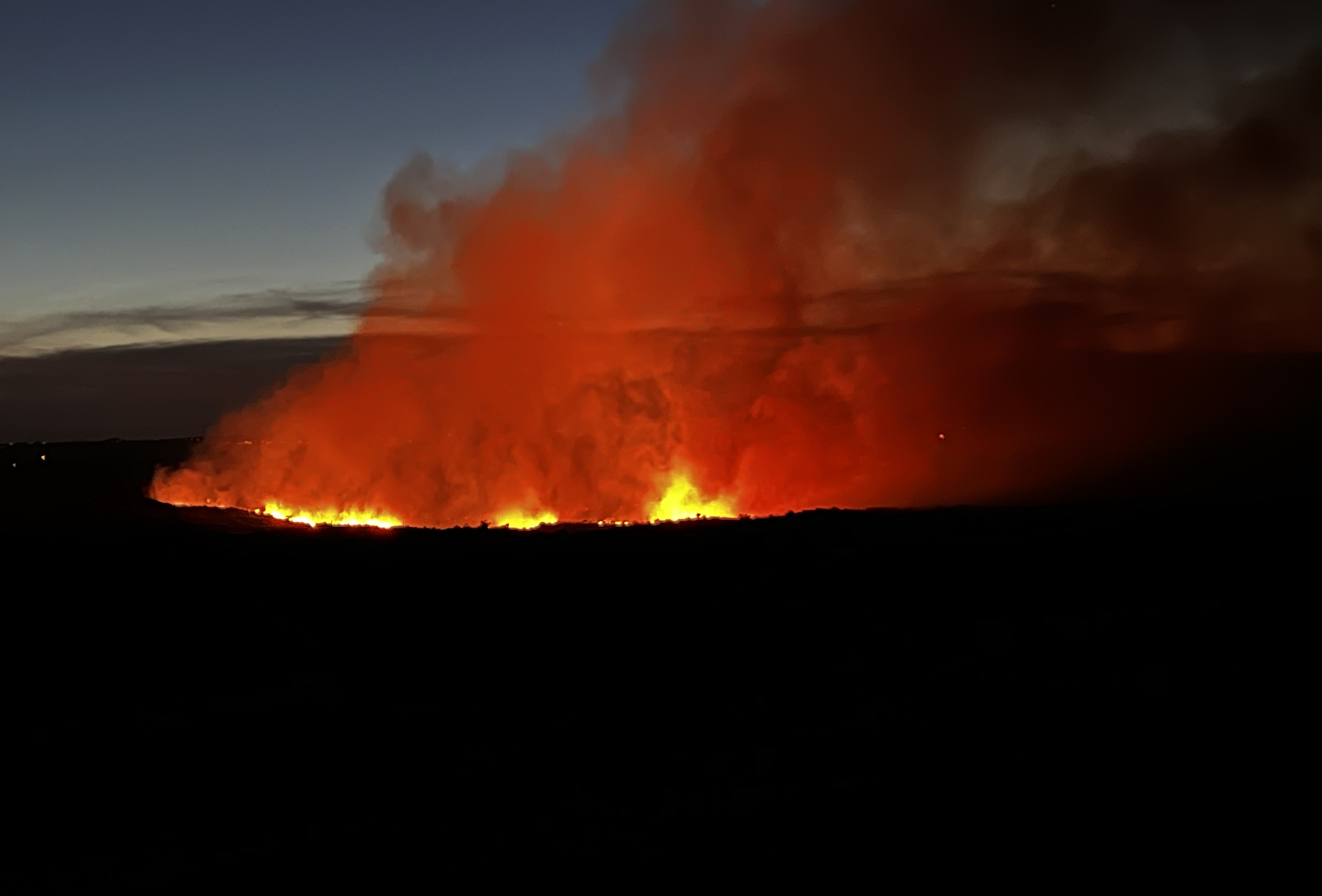
- The fire burning on the night of June 6
- Date: June 2, 2024 –; June 10, 2024

Statistics
- Perimeter: 100% contained
- Burned area: 5,029 acres (2,035 ha; 8 sq mi; 20 km^{2})

Impacts
- Deaths: 0
- Injuries: 0

Ignition
- Cause: Human
- Motive: Under investigation

The 2024 Adams Fire was a wildfire that rapidly burned 5,029 acres across Maricopa County, located in the U.S. state of Arizona from June 2 to June 10. 268 personnel were assigned to the fire, and the fire was determined to have been human-caused.

== Progression ==
The fire started on June 2, and by June 4 it had already covered a maximum of 5,029 acres. Firefighters also continued working on control lines, and was declared 30% contained the same day. By June 5, the fire had reached 49% containment, and it was determined that the fire was human-caused. 268 personnel were assigned to the fire. The north side of the fire was chosen for containment efforts. On June 6, the fire was 62% contained, and the fire was approximated to be one mile east of Fort McDowell.

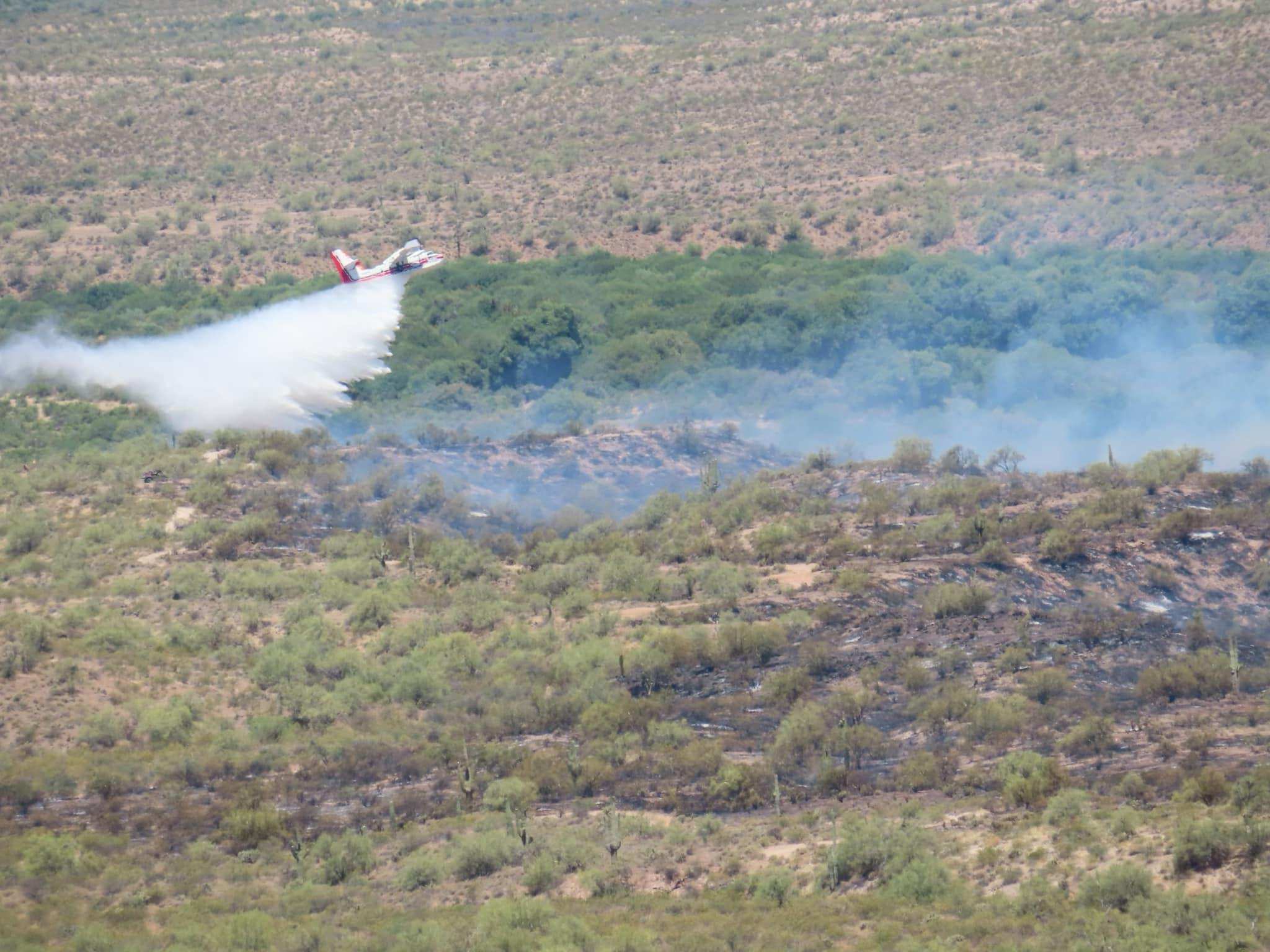
An aircraft dropping water on the fire on June 6

On June 7, Tonto National Forest remained closed as the fire burned, and containment on the fire reached 86%. Fire crews made further progress on containment on the south side of the fire. Crews also repaired structures along roads that were used for accessing the fire during earlier operations. By June 8, the fire was 91% contained, while staying at 5,029 acres. Fire crews also prioritized mopping up the interior portions of the fire, specifically on the north and west sides.

By June 9, had stayed at 91% containment, and on June 10 the fire had reached 100% containment while 124 personnel, including 2 helitacks were assigned to the fire. Command over the fire was also handed off to the Tonto National Forest services on the same day.

== Effects ==
The fire prompted evacuations near Fort McDowell off State Route 87. Smoke lingered in the burn area several days after full containment.

== Growth and containment table ==
Date	Area burned	Containment
June 2	N/A	N/A
June 3	3,200 acres (13 km^{2})	
June 4	5,029 acres (20 km^{2})	
June 5	5,029 acres (20 km^{2})	
June 6	5,029 acres (20 km^{2})	
June 7	5,029 acres (20 km^{2})	
June 8	5,029 acres (20 km^{2})	
June 9	5,029 acres (20 km^{2})	
June 10	5,029 acres (20 km^{2})	

== See also ==
- Wildcat Fire
- 2024 California wildfires
- Park Fire
