= Greenhorn, California =

Greenhorn
- Unincorporated Community; Census Designated Place
- Location in Plumas County and the state of California

- Location in the United States
- Coordinates: 39°54′21″N 120°44′55″W
- Country: United States
- State: California
- County: Plumas

Area
  - Total: 6.711 sq mi (17.381 km^{2})
  - Land: 6.711 sq mi (17.381 km^{2})
  - Water: 0 sq mi (0 km^{2}) 0%
- Elevation: 4,436 ft (1,352 m)

Population (2020)
  - Total: 247
  - Density: 36.8/sq mi (14.2/km^{2})
- Time zone: UTC-8 (Pacific (PST))
  - Summer (DST): UTC-7 (PDT)
- ZIP code: 95971
- Area code: 530
- FIPS code: 06-31029
- GNIS feature ID: 1853393

Greenhorn is a census-designated place (CDP) in Plumas County, California, United States. The population was 247 at the 2020 census, up from 236 at the 2010 census.

== Geography ==
Greenhorn is located at 39°54′21″N 120°44′55″W (39.905794, -120.748665).

According to the United States Census Bureau, the CDP has a total area of 6.7 square miles (17 km^{2}), all land.

== Demographics ==
Historical population
Census	Pop.	Note	%±
2000	146		—
2010	236		61.6%
2020	247		4.7%
U.S. Decennial Census; 1860–1870 1880-1890; 1900 1910 1920; 1930 1940 1950; 1960 1970 1980; 1990 2000 2010

Greenhorn first appeared as a census designated place in the 2000 U.S. census.

=== 2020 ===
Greenhorn CDP, California – Racial and ethnic composition Note: the US Census treats Hispanic/Latino as an ethnic category. This table excludes Latinos from the racial categories and assigns them to a separate category. Hispanics/Latinos may be of any race.
Race / Ethnicity (NH = Non-Hispanic)	Pop 2000	Pop 2010	Pop 2020	% 2000	% 2010	% 2020
White alone (NH)	207	198	131	83.81%	83.90%	89.73%
Black or African American alone (NH)	0	1	0	0.00%	0.42%	0.00%
Native American or Alaska Native alone (NH)	7	7	1	2.83%	2.97%	0.68%
Asian alone (NH)	2	2	0	0.81%	0.85%	0.00%
Native Hawaiian or Pacific Islander alone (NH)	0	0	0	0.00%	0.00%	0.00%
Other race alone (NH)	2	0	0	0.81%	0.00%	0.00%
Mixed race or Multiracial (NH)	7	6	7	2.83%	2.54%	4.79%
Hispanic or Latino (any race)	22	22	7	8.91%	9.32%	4.79%
Total	247	236	146	100.00%	100.00%	100.00%

The 2020 United States census reported that Greenhorn had a population of 247. The population density was 36.8 inhabitants per square mile (14.2/km^{2}). The racial makeup of Greenhorn was 211 (85.4%) White, 0 (0.0%) African American, 7 (2.8%) Native American, 2 (0.8%) Asian, 0 (0.0%) Pacific Islander, 9 (3.6%) from other races, and 18 (7.3%) from two or more races. Hispanic or Latino of any race were 22 persons (8.9%).

The whole population lived in households. There were 108 households, out of which 18 (16.7%) had children under the age of 18 living in them, 47 (43.5%) were married-couple households, 7 (6.5%) were cohabiting couple households, 16 (14.8%) had a female householder with no partner present, and 38 (35.2%) had a male householder with no partner present. 47 households (43.5%) were one person, and 13 (12.0%) were one person aged 65 or older. The average household size was 2.29. There were 53 families (49.1% of all households).

The age distribution was 54 people (21.9%) under the age of 18, 7 people (2.8%) aged 18 to 24, 62 people (25.1%) aged 25 to 44, 49 people (19.8%) aged 45 to 64, and 75 people (30.4%) who were 65 years of age or older. The median age was 46.5 years. For every 100 females, there were 120.5 males.

There were 140 housing units at an average density of 20.9 units per square mile (8.1 units/km^{2}), of which 108 (77.1%) were occupied. Of these, 66 (61.1%) were owner-occupied, and 42 (38.9%) were occupied by renters.

=== 2010 ===
At the 2010 census Greenhorn had a population of 236. The population density was 35.2 inhabitants per square mile (13.6/km^{2}). The racial makeup of Greenhorn was 213 (90.3%) White, 1 (0.4%) African American, 7 (3.0%) Native American, 2 (0.8%) Asian, 0 (0.0%) Pacific Islander, 6 (2.5%) from other races, and 7 (3.0%) from two or more races. Hispanic or Latino of any race were 22 people (9.3%).

The whole population lived in households, no one lived in non-institutionalized group quarters and no one was institutionalized.

There were 106 households, 23 (21.7%) had children under the age of 18 living in them, 56 (52.8%) were opposite-sex married couples living together, 4 (3.8%) had a female householder with no husband present, 4 (3.8%) had a male householder with no wife present. There were 7 (6.6%) unmarried opposite-sex partnerships, and 1 (0.9%) same-sex married couples or partnerships. 33 households (31.1%) were one person and 9 (8.5%) had someone living alone who was 65 or older. The average household size was 2.23. There were 64 families (60.4% of households); the average family size was 2.81.

The age distribution was 43 people (18.2%) under the age of 18, 15 people (6.4%) aged 18 to 24, 47 people (19.9%) aged 25 to 44, 88 people (37.3%) aged 45 to 64, and 43 people (18.2%) who were 65 or older. The median age was 46.9 years. For every 100 females, there were 96.7 males. For every 100 females age 18 and over, there were 103.2 males.

There were 140 housing units at an average density of 20.9 per square mile, of the occupied units 95 (89.6%) were owner-occupied and 11 (10.4%) were rented. The homeowner vacancy rate was 6.9%; the rental vacancy rate was 8.3%. 211 people (89.4% of the population) lived in owner-occupied housing units and 25 people (10.6%) lived in rental housing units.

== Politics ==
In the state legislature, Greenhorn is in the 1st senatorial district, represented by Republican Megan Dahle, and the 1st Assembly district, represented by Republican Heather Hadwick.

Federally, Greenhorn is in California's 3rd congressional district, represented by Independent Kevin Kiley.

== Education ==
The school district is Plumas Unified School District.
