= Wildcat Fire =

2024 wildfire in Arizona, USA

- Part of the 2024 Arizona wildfires
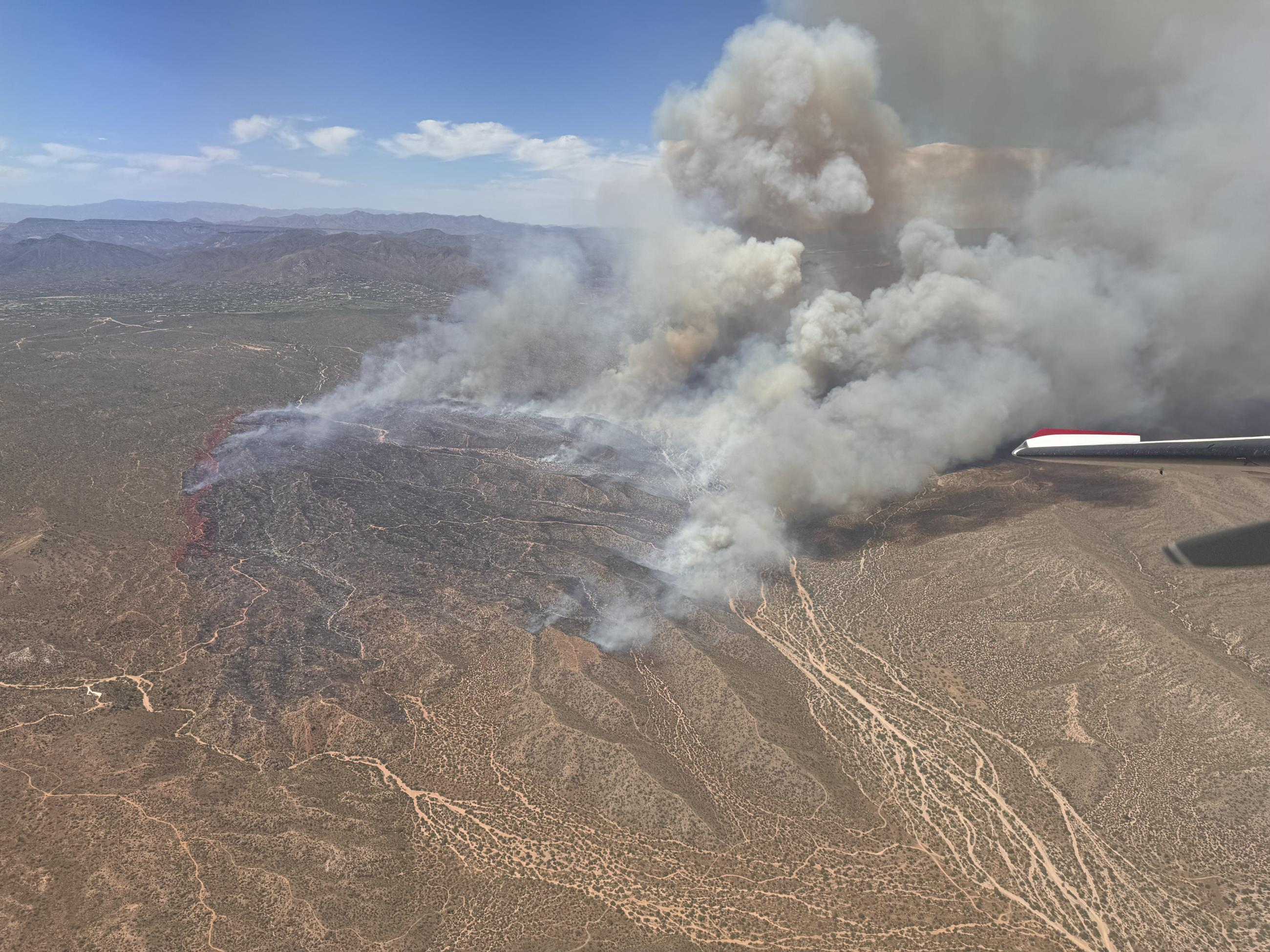
- An aerial view of the Wildcat Fire, as seen on May 18, 2024
- Date: May 18, 2024 –; June 3, 2024

Statistics
- Perimeter: 100% contained
- Burned area: 14,402 acres (5,828 ha; 23 sq mi; 58 km^{2})

Impacts
- Deaths: 0
- Injuries: 0

Ignition
- Cause: Human-caused
- Motive: Unknown

The 2024 Wildcat Fire was a relatively large wildfire that burned in the Tonto National Forest, located in the U.S. state of Arizona. The fire burned 14,402 acres of land before being declared contained on June 3. It was the second-largest wildfire of the 2024 Arizona wildfire season, only behind the Freeman Fire.

== Progression ==
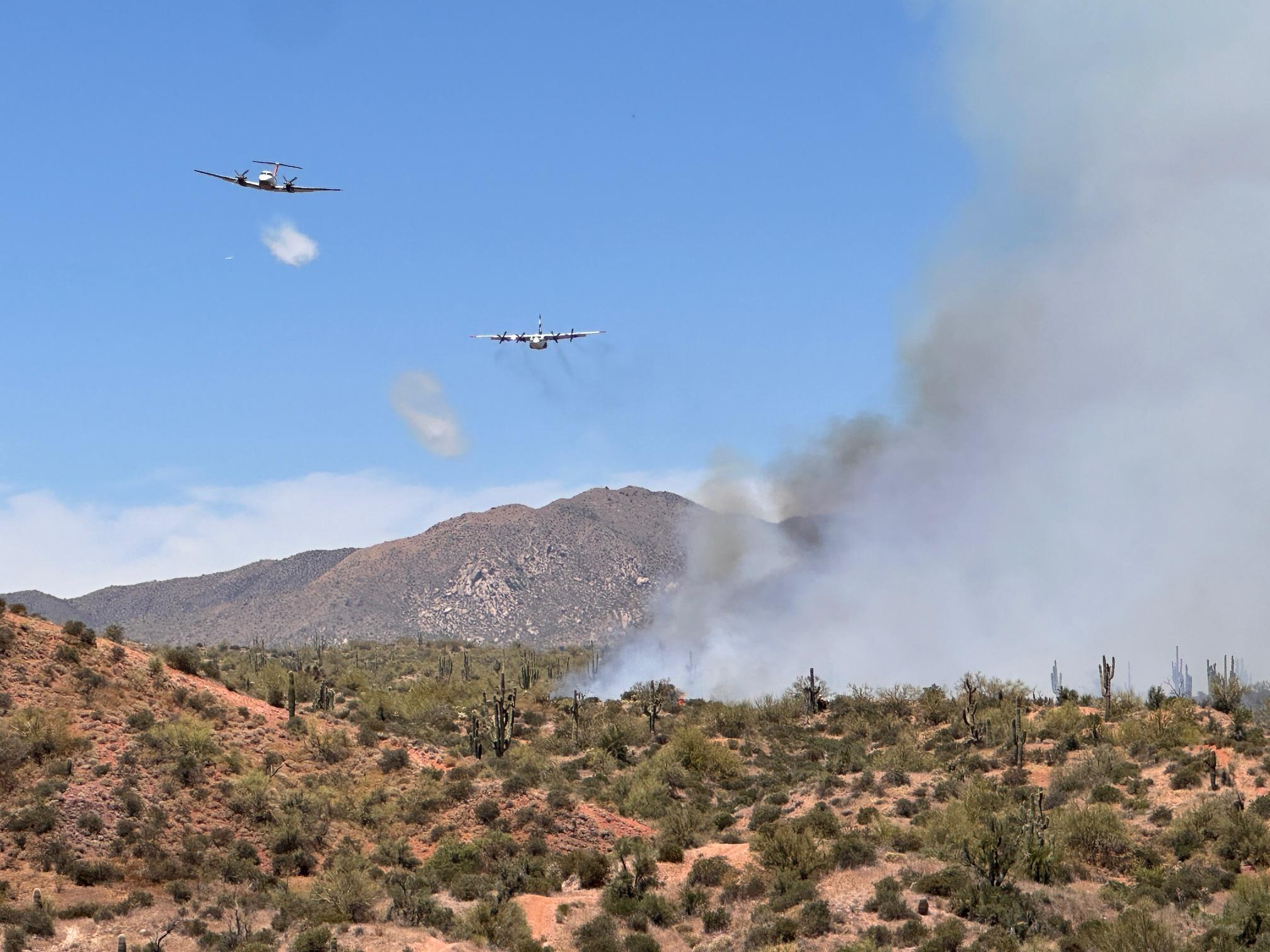
Aircraft assisting with suppression efforts on the fire, May 18

The fire started at approximately 9:20 a.m. on May 18 near Vista Verde, north of Dynamite Blvd and 136th Street, located west of Bartlett Lake. On the first day of the fire, upwards of 5,000 acres were already burned, and that number went up to 12,000 on May 19. On the same day, 180 personnel were assigned to the fire, which included 2 helicopters. On May 20, the fire again grew to 14,072 acres, and another 120 personnel were dispatched to the growing fire. The fire quickly spread east of the Desert Mountain Community, reaching a size of 14,283 acres on May 21, where the first containment efforts were carried out by firefighters. 318 personnel were assigned to the fire. By May 22, the fire reached its maximum size, covering 14,402 acres of land and grass in Maricopa County. The fire was 36% contained by that time, and the number of personnel dispatched to the fire dropped to 197.

On May 23, a further 20% of the fire was contained by personnel, and there was no gain in acreage covered by the fire. The number of personnel dispatched dropped to 109. On May 24, the size of the wildfire stayed consistent, and the percentage contained was up to 64%. 110 personnel were dispatched to the fire.

== Growth and containment table ==
Date	Area burned	Personnel	Containment
May 18	5,000 acres (20 km^{2})	0	
May 19	12,000 acres (49 km^{2})	180	
May 20	14,072 acres (57 km^{2})	300	
May 21	14,283 acres (58 km^{2})	318	
May 22	14,402 acres (58 km^{2})	197	
May 23	14,402 acres (58 km^{2})	109	
May 24	14,402 acres (58 km^{2})	110	

== See also ==
- 2024 California wildfires
- 2024 Canadian wildfires
- Park Fire
- Pedro Fire
- Borel Fire
- List of Arizona wildfires
