= Park Fire =

2024 wildfire in Northern California, USA

- Part of the 2024 California wildfires
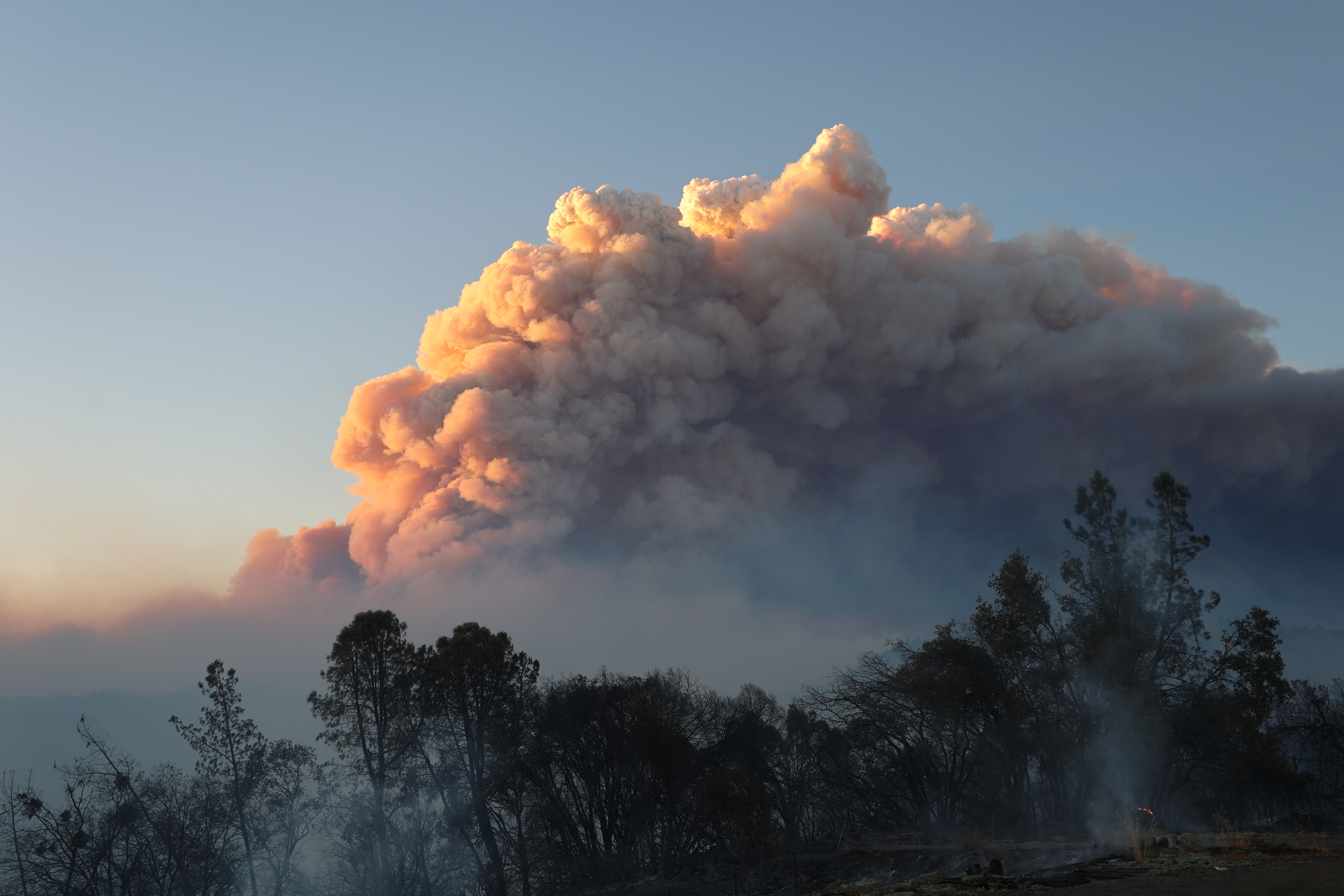
- Smoke plume of the fire in Butte County as seen near the CARD Wildwood Park in Chico on the evening of July 25, 2024
- Date: July 24 –; September 26, 2024; (64 days)
- Location: Butte County and; Tehama County, Northern California, United States
- Coordinates: 39.778°N 121.761°W

Statistics
- Burned area: 429,603 acres (173,854 ha; 671 sq mi; 1,739 km^{2})

Impacts
- Deaths: 0
- Injuries: 4
- Evacuated: >4,000 people
- Structures destroyed: 709 (54 damaged)
- Cost: $351 million (firefighting costs)

Ignition
- Cause: Arson

Map
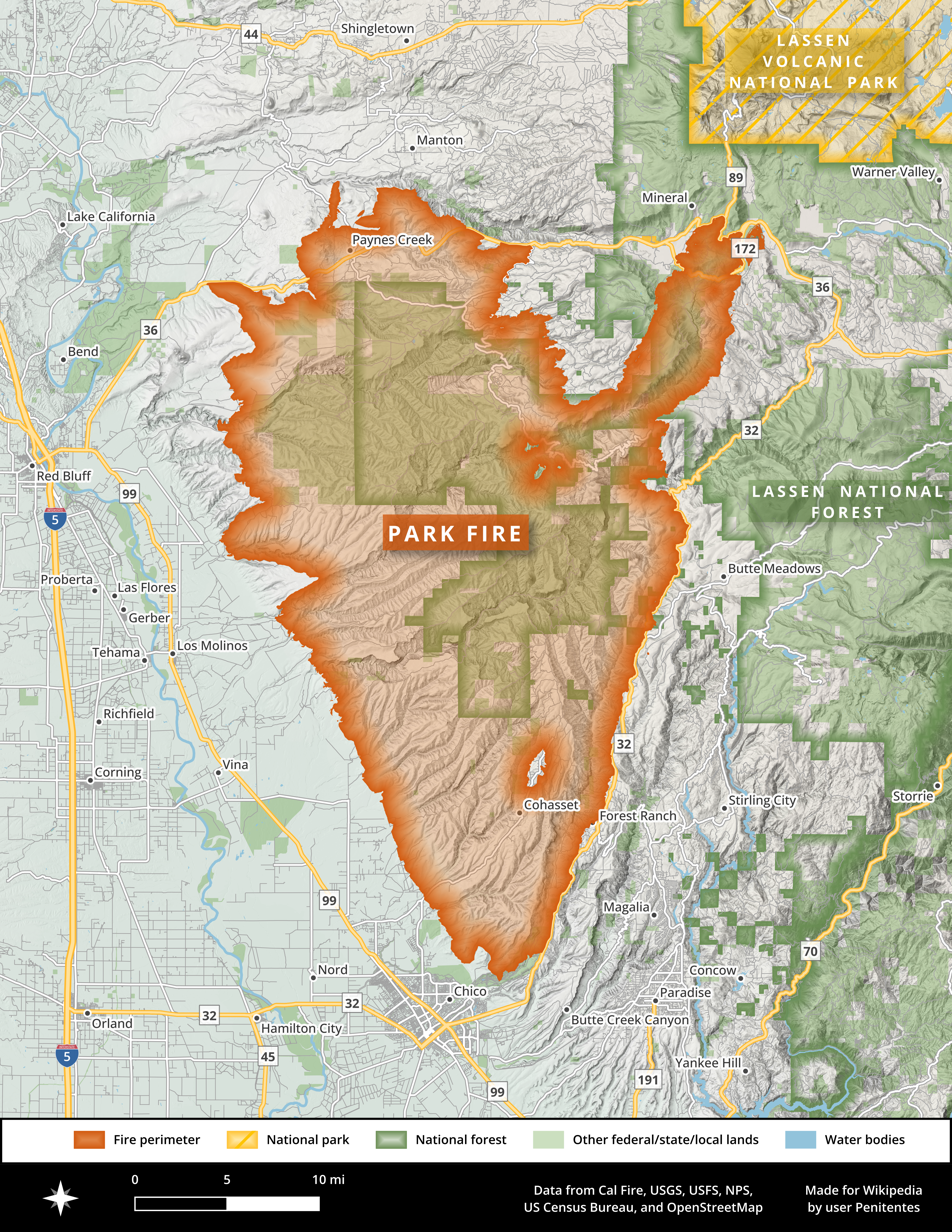
- The footprint of the Park Fire in Butte and Tehama counties as of August 15

- The general location of the Park Fire in Northern California

The Park Fire was an extremely large and destructive wildfire in Northern California's Butte and Tehama counties. Igniting on July 24, 2024 in an alleged act of arson in the city of Chico's Bidwell Park in Butte County, the fire grew rapidly over the following days, burning into the Ishi Wilderness and the Lassen National Forest. Over 4,000 residents in foothill communities evacuated, Lassen Volcanic National Park closed to the public for three weeks, and over 700 structures were destroyed. The fire burned a total of 429,603 acres (173,854 hectares) before being fully contained on September 26, 2024. Fire suppression operations cost $351 million.

The Park Fire became the largest wildfire of California's 2024 wildfire season, the fourth largest in California history, the second largest single wildfire (as compared to a wildfire complex, with multiple fires), and the largest fire ever caused by arson in the state.

== Background ==
The rapid growth of the Park Fire in late July was enabled by hot and dry conditions. July 2024 was California's hottest month ever recorded, thanks to an almost two-week heatwave in the interior of the state. Areas in the fire's vicinity endured temperatures of 100 to 110 degrees Fahrenheit (38 to 43 °C) during the week before it ignited, and in Chico itself, the temperature surpassed 100 °F (38 °C) on the majority of days in July.

Evaporative demand (a measure of the atmosphere's capability to draw water out of vegetation and other sources of moisture) increased across much of the state, and particularly so in the Central Valley, which led to an increase in fire danger. California had already had an active fire season; by July 23, the day before the Park Fire ignited, approximately 287,000 acres (116,000 ha) had burned across the state. This was more than twice the year-to-date average.

Butte County, where the fire began, has endured several of the state's largest, deadliest, and most destructive wildfires. The Camp Fire in 2018, the North Complex Fire in 2020, and the Dixie Fire in 2021 all burned at least partially within Butte County. The county's topography ranges from the flat Central Valley in the west to the forested Sierra Nevada in the east, with grasslands, oak woodlands, and chaparral landscapes in between. Hot and dry summer weather, fire-receptive vegetation, and large roadless areas enable wildfires in the region to become large. A New York Times analysis calculated that 38 percent of Butte County and 40 percent of Tehama County burned in wildfires between 2014 and 2024, an area four to five times as large as the area burned in the two counties in the previous decade.

== Cause ==
The Park Fire began near Upper Park Road in upper Bidwell Park approximately four miles (6.4 km) northeast of downtown Chico, within city limits. Bidwell Park is a large municipal park and recreational area that stretches from Chico itself into the foothills of the Sierra Nevada. Around 2:44 p.m. PDT on Wednesday, July 24, 2024, Chico resident Ronnie Dean Stout II, driving his mother's 2007 Toyota Yaris, pulled it over to the side of a road in the Upper Park and went over a berm, causing the car to become stuck in grass, so Stout revved the engine to try and free it, which set the grass beneath the vehicle afire, and then the car itself.

Stout claimed that he panicked and left the car without moving it. However, eyewitness accounts assert that Stout instead put it in neutral and then pushed the burning vehicle backwards off the embankment, whereupon it fell approximately 60 feet (18 m) and landed in a ravine. The car continued to burn, and the flames spread to nearby vegetation. Witnesses claim Stout joined the crowd fleeing the growing fire. Later, California Highway Patrol investigators examined the car and found it in neutral. Butte County District Attorney's Office and Cal Fire investigators arrested Stout at his residence in a Chico mobile home park around 1:30 a.m. the following morning. The Park Fire is the largest arson-caused wildfire in modern California history.

== Progression ==
=== July 24 ===
The first report of the Park Fire came at 2:44 p.m., when at least two people made calls to 911 reporting that a car was ablaze and that it had just set the grass around it on fire. The location given by callers was Alligator Hole in the upper portion of Bidwell Park, near Upper Park Road. The first firefighting personnel on scene reported a fire of four to five acres (1.6 to 2.0 ha) in size. During the initial fight to contain the fire, aircraft were unable to drop fire retardant or water because the fire was burning beneath high-voltage power lines.

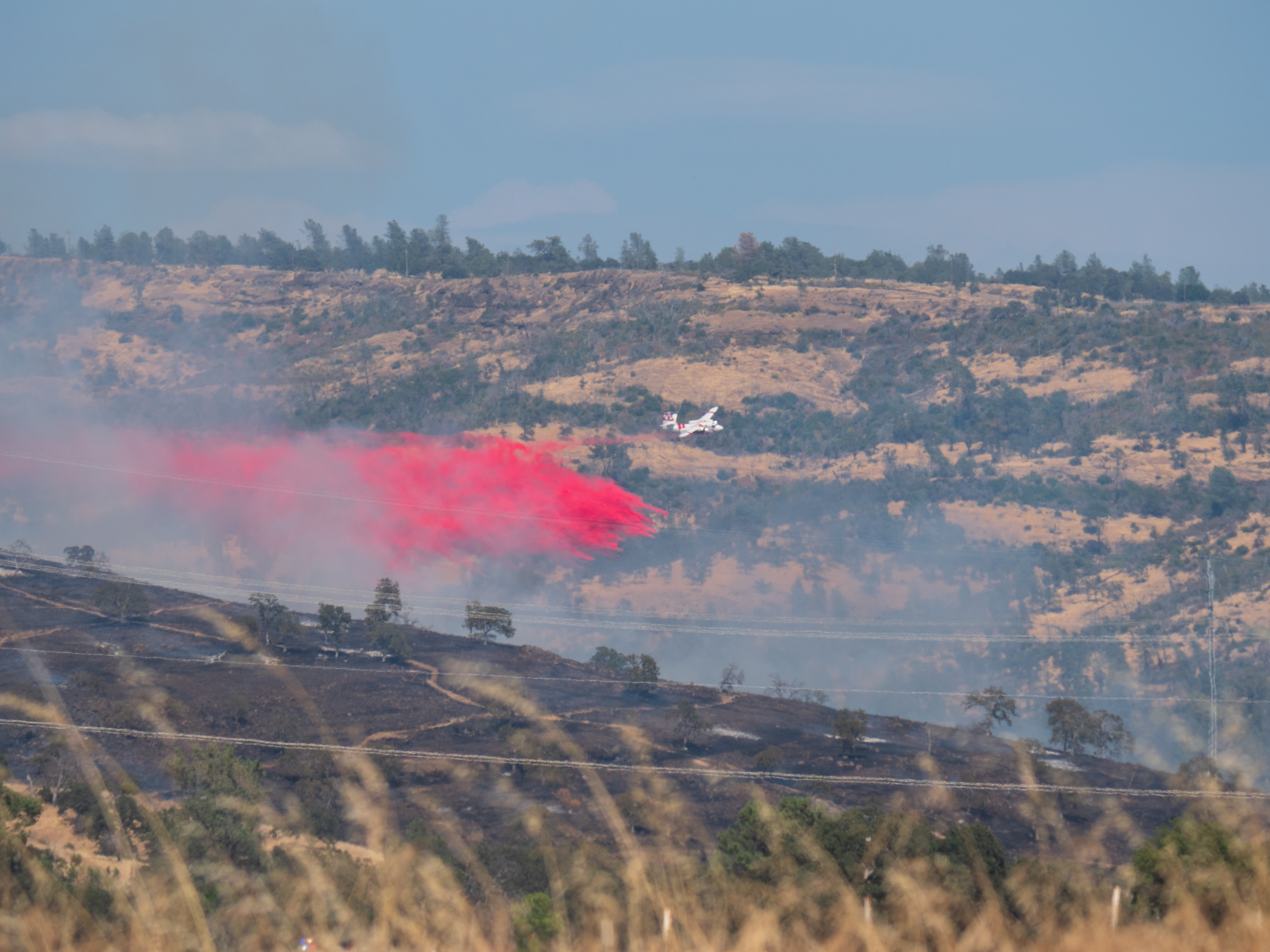
An air tanker engages the Park Fire in Upper Bidwell Park during the early hours of the fire on July 24

From this ignition point the Park Fire spread north, driven by winds out of the south of up to 24 miles per hour (39 km/h). The fire burned 500 acres (200 ha) by 5:00 p.m., 1,000 acres (400 ha) by 5:54 p.m., and 1,500 acres (610 ha) another hour after that.

Residents of Cohasset, a community of several hundred people northeast of Chico in Butte County that is usually accessible only by Cohasset Road, found themselves unable to leave when flames overran the way. At around 8:00 p.m., a convoy of 100–150 people made their way out to California State Route 32 via logging roads when Sierra Pacific Industries (SPI), which owns much of the land surrounding the town, unlocked gates on their property. Many people remained in Cohasset, however, and at 9:00 p.m. Cal Fire directed that two National Guard helicopters fly to Cohasset for possible evacuations. At 9:10 p.m. a second group of 80-100 people, led by SPI employees, made their way via more logging roads north to California State Route 36 from upper Cohasset Road. By 10:15 p.m., the Park Fire had burned 6,465 acres (2,616 ha).

As it spread north, the fire established itself in the Ishi Wilderness, an area with little history of wildfire, heavy vegetation cover, and few easy access routes for ground-based firefighting personnel. The fire produced pyrocumulus clouds and burned actively into the night. Despite the efforts of ground crews and three night-flying helicopters, the wind-driven fire continued to burn largely north—parallel to California State Route 99—and into Tehama County. At 3:00 a.m. Cal Fire announced that the fire had so far burned 45,549 acres (18,433 ha); this made it the largest wildfire of the year in California, surpassing the 38,664-acre (15,647 ha) Lake Fire in Southern California's Santa Barbara County. During the fire's first 12 hours, it grew at a rate of 4,000 acres (1,600 ha) per hour.

=== July 25–July 31 ===
By mid-day on Thursday, July 25, the Park Fire had burned 71,000 acres (29,000 ha). At 4:40 p.m., the Butte County Sheriff's Office issued voluntary evacuation warnings for northwestern portions of the city of Paradise, which had been devastated by the Camp Fire in 2018. The fire also generated a fire whirl.

On Friday morning, Cal Fire reported that the Park Fire had burned 164,286 acres (66,484 ha) and was zero percent contained. Evacuation orders were in place for northeastern Chico, Forest Ranch, and Cohasset in Butte County, and Campbellville in Tehama County. On Friday, the fire crossed Highway 36 near Paynes Creek.

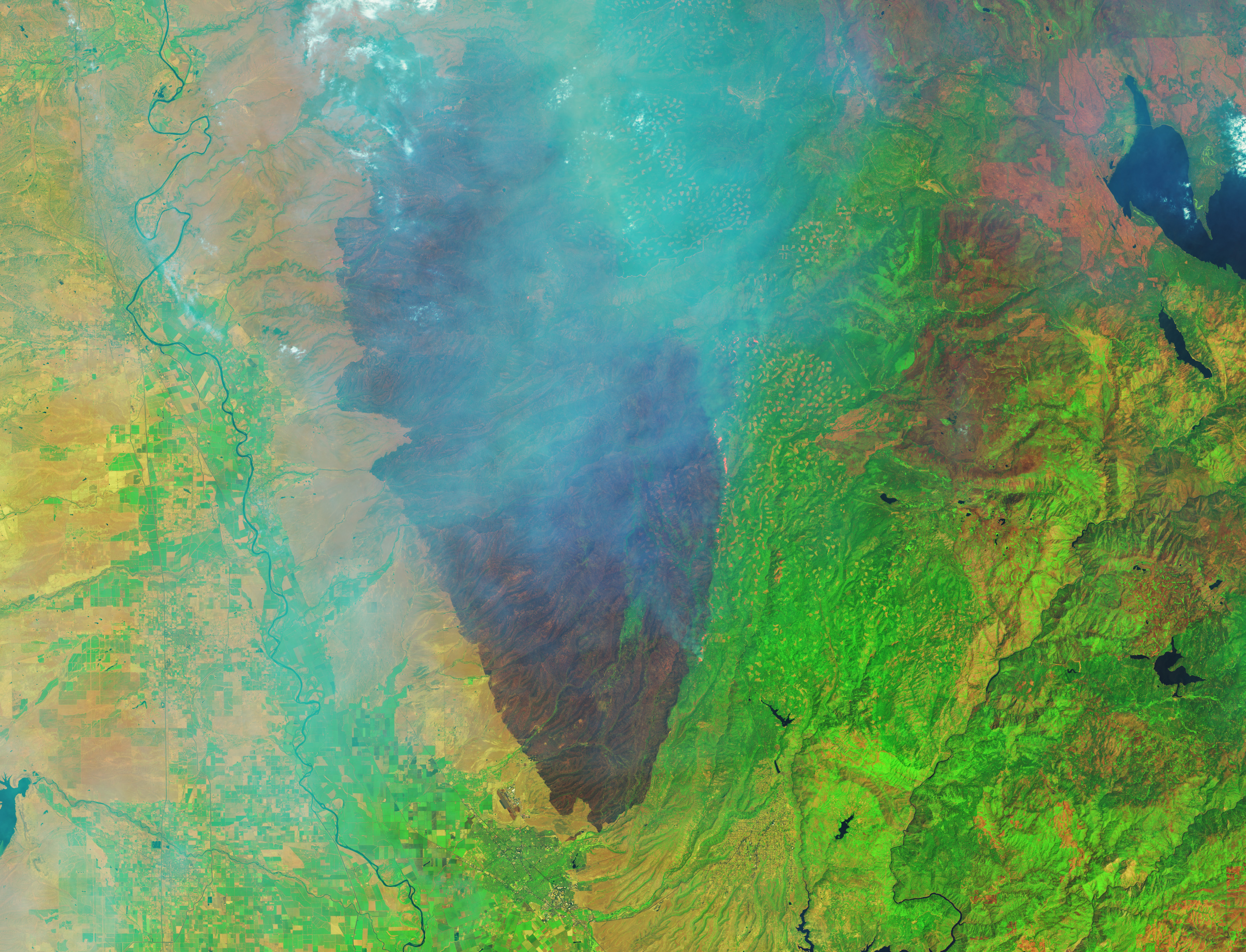
A false-color Landsat 9 satellite image showing the burn scar and smoke from the fire on July 27

The Park Fire surpassed 300,000 acres (120,000 ha) in burned area by the morning of Saturday, July 27, less than 72 hours after ignition. The Cal Fire incident commander, Billy See, estimated at a press conference on Saturday morning that since its ignition the fire had been expanding at the rate of 5,000 acres (2,000 ha) per hour: "...to put that into perspective, we’re looking at almost eight square miles [21 km^{2}] an hour this thing is taking out". A Cal Fire spokesperson told SFGate later that day that "This fire is going to burn for another couple weeks for sure. Even if the fire stopped tomorrow, there would still be weeks of work to do. This is a long-duration fire."

Thousands of firefighters battled to contain the fire as of 29 July 2024. Texas governor Greg Abbott deployed resources to assist in California wildfire response.

=== August ===
Between August 9 and August 16, containment increased by 15 percent. Firefighters achieved 50 percent containment of the fire's perimeter on August 17. Crews began work to repair the damage done by fire suppression efforts (such as erosion and the creation of firebreaks) in Butte County in mid-August, anticipating that it would take two to three months to complete that work around the entire fire perimeter.

The National Weather Service office in Sacramento issued a 24-hour flash flood watch for the entirety of the Park Fire burn scar, warning of potential debris flows from scattered showers and thunderstorms on August 23–24. All weather stations within the fire's perimeter recorded greater than one-half inch (1.3 cm) of rain during this period. On Saturday the 24th, firefighters observed no active flames and containment of the perimeter reached 71 percent by that night, one month to the day after the fire's ignition.

=== September ===
On September 26, the fire reached 100 percent containment, after burning a total of 429,603 acres (173,854 ha), making the Park Fire the largest wildfire in California in 2024 and the fourth largest in California history. Fire suppression operations cost $351 million.

== Effects ==
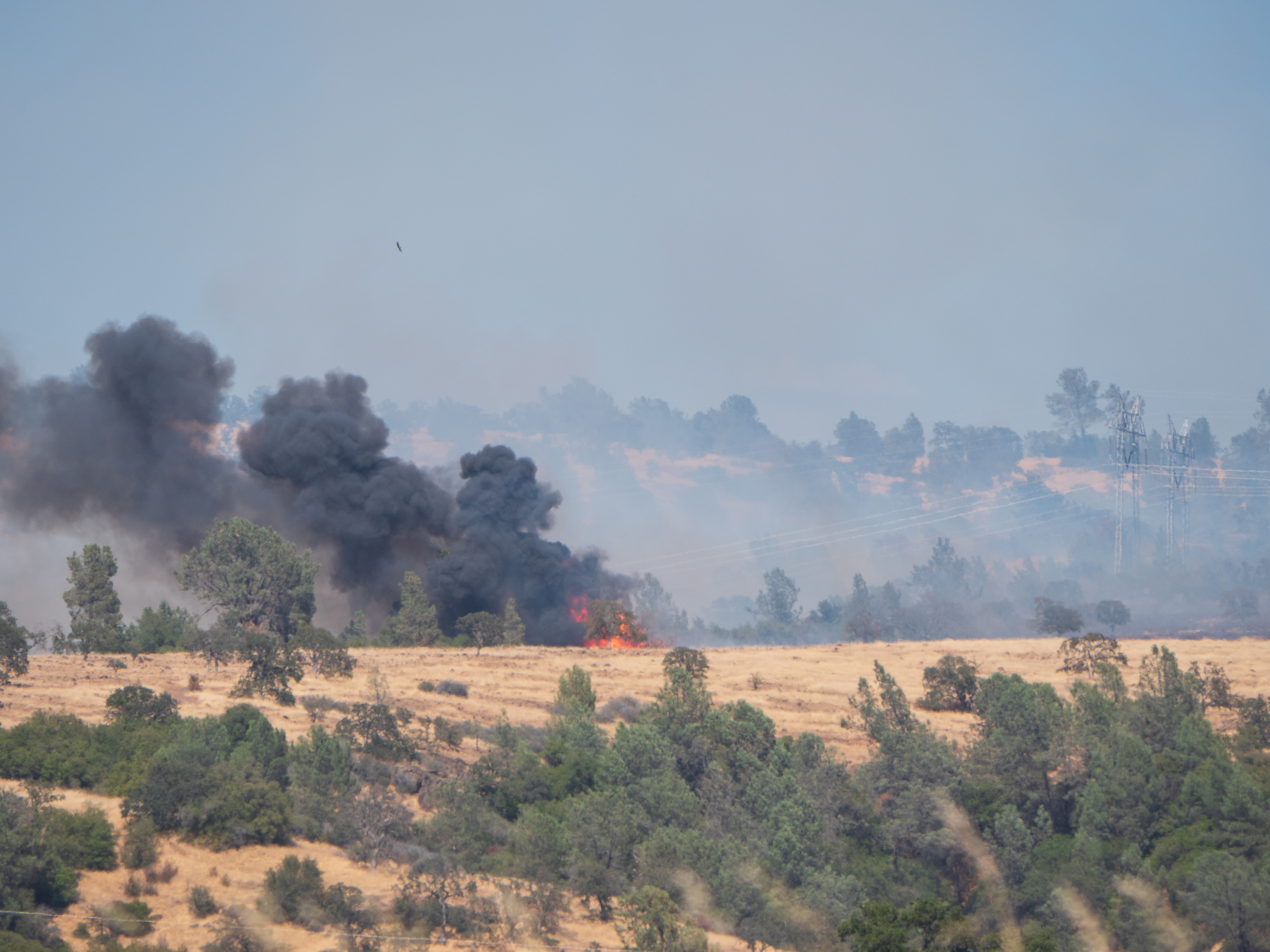
The Park Fire makes a push up the cliffside north of Upper Bidwell Park, an hour after ignition on July 24

Butte County declared a local state of emergency on Friday, July 25. On Sunday, July 26, California governor Gavin Newsom declared a state of emergency for areas affected in Butte and Tehama counties. The White House released a statement the same day, noting that President Joe Biden had been briefed on the fire and had "directed his team to do everything possible to support ongoing fire suppression". Shasta County declared a local state of emergency on July 31, 2024.

At least three firefighters sustained heat-related injuries.

=== Damage ===
The fire destroyed 709 structures and damaged 54 others. An unknown number of structures burned in the community of Cohasset, which took a "direct hit" from the fire. Amid the damage inspection process, Cal Fire incident commander described the survival rate for buildings in the fire area as 66 to 68 percent. The fire burned the majority of the Big Chico Creek Ecological Reserve, a 7,800-acre (3,200 ha) property owned and used for educational purposes by Chico State University. Multiple buildings there burned, including a historic barn and university offices. The McCarthy Point Lookout, a fire lookout post built in 1936 overlooking Mill Creek Canyon, was destroyed. Electrical infrastructure was also lost in the fire, including transformers, power line segments, and 450 power line poles, mostly in the vicinity of Cohasset and Forest Ranch. Three thousand people serviced by Pacific Gas & Electric lost power; service was restored to two-thirds of those customers by Tuesday, July 30.

=== Closures and evacuations ===
The fire prompted evacuation orders for parts of Butte, Shasta and Tehama counties, including residential areas near Chico and the city's airport. By the morning of Thursday, July 25, more than 4,000 people were subject to evacuation orders, including the entire community of Cohasset. Included in the evacuation orders were specific areas to evacuate and shelter large and small animals. The Tehama County Sheriff's Office provided short escorts into specific evacuation zones for owners to evacuate or care for animals that may have been left behind. The North Valley Animal Disaster Group hosted many evacuated pets and large animals for those evacuated due to the fire. On July 28, Shingletown was evacuated on the north side of the fire. On July 30, two women were arrested for re-entering Cohasset while it remained under a mandatory evacuation order. Another man was arrested for entering an evacuation zone in Shingletown. The last remaining evacuation warnings, for parts of Tehama County, were lifted on August 20.

On Saturday, July 27, Lassen Volcanic National Park closed to the public, evacuating visitors from campgrounds, employees from park housing, and cancelling reservations. Park officials cited concerns that the Park Fire could encroach upon the national park's western side, including Manzanita Lake and park headquarters in the community of Mineral. The fire did not burn into the park itself, which partially reopened on August 17.

The closed portion of California State Route 32 reopened on August 15.

=== Environmental impacts ===
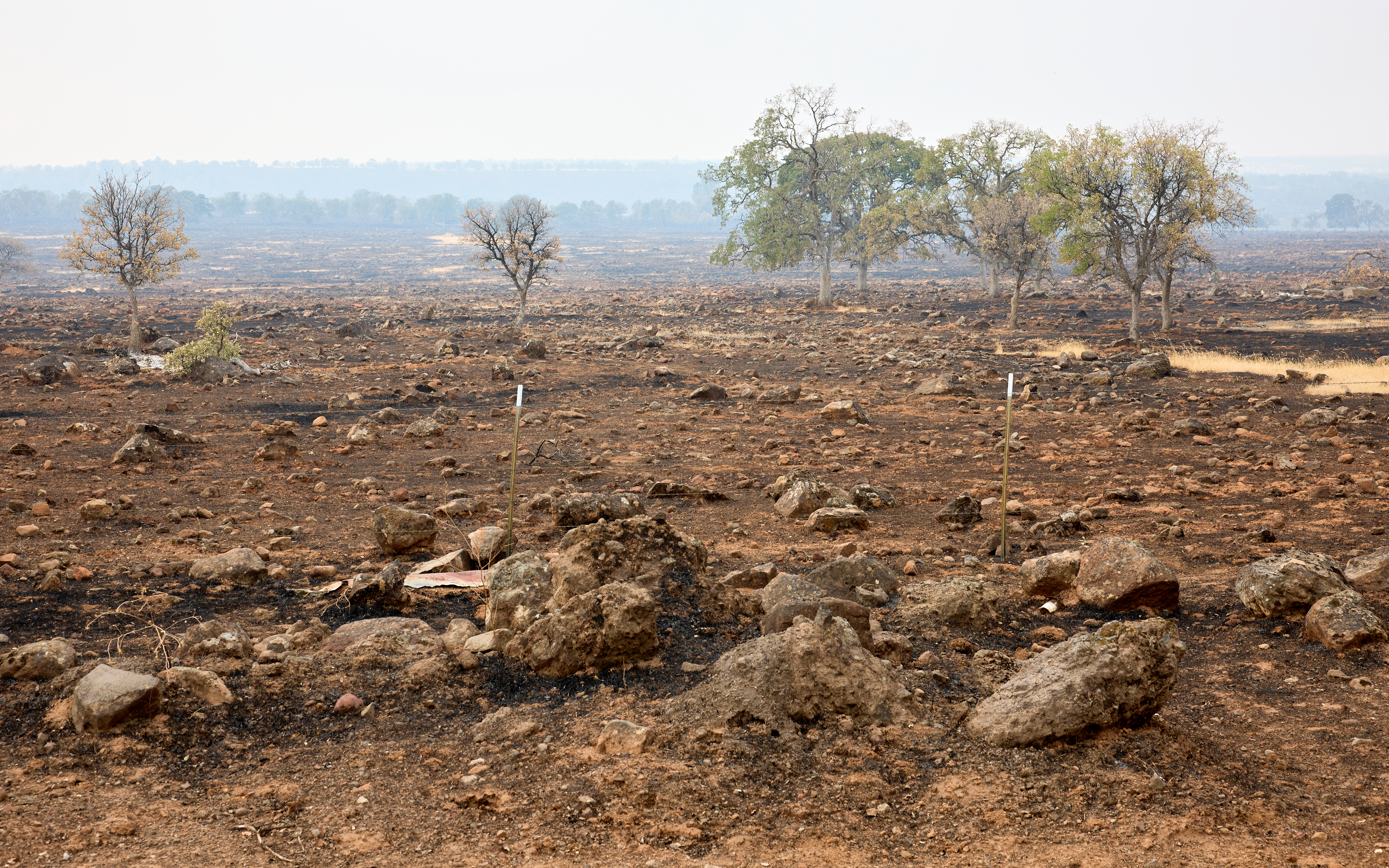
A burned area along Highway 36, east of Paynes Creek, in Tehama County

Drifting smoke from the Park Fire caused officials in Reno, Nevada to issue an air quality emergency on July 30 when air quality indices reached unhealthy levels.

Environmental scientists and officials fear that the Park Fire will negatively impact endangered populations of spring-run Chinook salmon in Tehama County's Mill Creek and Deer Creek watersheds. Firefighting operations can introduce fire retardant—which is toxic to fish—into waterways, and post-fire rains may wash sediment and debris into the water, causing algal blooms, suffocating fish, or blocking parts of the river. Such an event occurred in 2022 in the Klamath River after flash floods in the McKinney Fire burn scar.

The fire caused an unanticipated second bloom of native milkweed at the Big Chico Creek Ecological Reserve.

== Legal proceedings ==
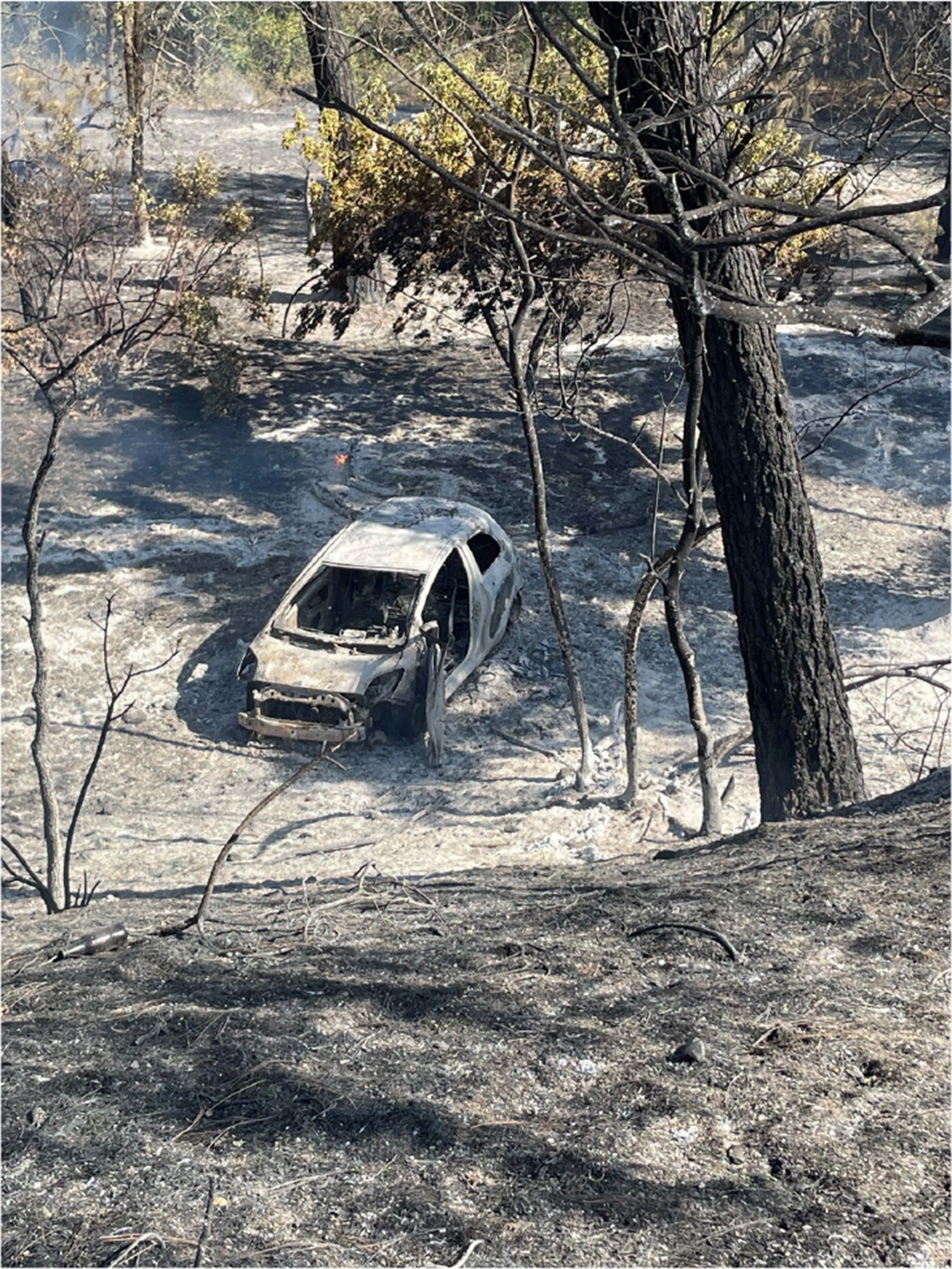
The toyota yaris allegedly involved

The Butte County District Attorney's office announced the arrest of Ronnie Dean Stout II (born January 10, 1982), a 42-year-old resident of Chico on July 25, the second day of the fire. Stout was held under suspicion of having ignited the Park Fire by pushing a flaming 2007 Toyota Yaris—belonging to his mother—off an embankment in Bidwell Park. The district attorney's office alleged that the suspect blended in with other members of the public who fled from the growing fire.

Stout has two prior felony convictions: a 2001 child molestation conviction in Butte County, and a 2002 robbery conviction in Kern County. After the latter, Stout remained in prison for 16 years. At the time of his arrest in connection of the Park Fire, Stout was on probation for a previous DUI charge.

Stout was held in Butte County jail without any possibility of bail. He was arraigned on July 29 in Butte County Superior Court in Oroville, and charged with reckless arson with multiple enhancements. Stout did not enter a plea during that court appearance. The court ordered that he be held without bail, appointed a public defender and an additional arraignment was calendared for August 1, 2024. Stout appeared in court again on August 22 and pled not guilty. On July 24, 2026, two years after the fire began, Stout was convicted of arson.

== Growth and containment table ==
Fire containment status Gray: contained; Red: active; %: percent contained;
Date	Area burned	Personnel	Containment
Jul 24	6,465 acres (26 km^{2})	216	
Jul 25	124,948 acres (506 km^{2})	1,153	
Jul 26	239,152 acres (968 km^{2})	2,484	
Jul 27	350,012 acres (1,416 km^{2})	3,722	
Jul 28	360,141 acres (1,457 km^{2})	4,742	
Jul 29	373,357 acres (1,511 km^{2})	5,364	
Jul 30	386,764 acres (1,565 km^{2})	5,779	
Jul 31	391,200 acres (1,583 km^{2})	5,953	
Aug 1	393,012 acres (1,590 km^{2})	6,305	
Aug 2	399,615 acres (1,617 km^{2})	6,447	
Aug 3	401,199 acres (1,624 km^{2})	6,518	
Aug 4	401,508 acres (1,625 km^{2})	6,529	
Aug 5	406,579 acres (1,645 km^{2})	6,586	
Aug 6	414,890 acres (1,679 km^{2})	6,593	
Aug 7	422,924 acres (1,712 km^{2})	6,616	
Aug 8	427,067 acres (1,728 km^{2})	6,562	
Aug 9	428,808 acres (1,735 km^{2})	6,243	
Aug 10	429,135 acres (1,737 km^{2})	6,067	
Aug 11	429,188 acres (1,737 km^{2})	5,805	
Aug 12	429,259 acres (1,737 km^{2})	5,638	
Aug 13	429,259 acres (1,737 km^{2})	5,579	
Aug 14	429,259 acres (1,737 km^{2})	5,426	
Aug 15	429,263 acres (1,737 km^{2})	5,056	
Aug 16	429,263 acres (1,737 km^{2})	4,512	
Aug 17	429,263 acres (1,737 km^{2})	4,290	
Aug 18	429,388 acres (1,738 km^{2})	4,218	
Aug 19	429,401 acres (1,738 km^{2})	4,156	
Aug 20	429,401 acres (1,738 km^{2})	3,866	
Aug 21	429,460 acres (1,738 km^{2})	3,417	
Aug 22	429,460 acres (1,738 km^{2})	2,940	
Aug 23	429,460 acres (1,738 km^{2})	2,512	
Aug 24	429,603 acres (1,739 km^{2})	2,374	
Aug 25	429,603 acres (1,739 km^{2})	2,274	
Aug 26	429,603 acres (1,739 km^{2})	2,158	
Aug 27	429,603 acres (1,739 km^{2})	2,062	
Aug 28	429,603 acres (1,739 km^{2})	1,926	
Aug 29	429,603 acres (1,739 km^{2})	1,521	
Aug 30	429,603 acres (1,739 km^{2})	1,514	
Aug 31	429,603 acres (1,739 km^{2})	600	
Sep 1	429,603 acres (1,739 km^{2})	600	
Sep 2	429,603 acres (1,739 km^{2})	589	
Sep 3	429,603 acres (1,739 km^{2})	474	
Sep 4	429,603 acres (1,739 km^{2})	477	
Sep 5	429,603 acres (1,739 km^{2})	462	
...
Sep 26	429,603 acres (1,739 km^{2})	...	

== See also ==
- 2024 United States wildfires
- 2024 California wildfires
- Jasper wildfire
- List of California wildfires
