= Weather of 2024 =

The following is a list of weather events that occurred on Earth in the year 2024. There were several weather events which had a significant impact, such as blizzards, cold waves, droughts, heat waves, wildfires, floods, tornadoes, tropical cyclones, and severe weather events. The deadliest weather event of the year was the West African floods, in which heavy rainfall caused the deaths of over 1,500 people. However, the Japan heatwaves may have killed more people after causing record-high temperatures across Japan. The costliest weather event of the year was Hurricane Helene, which caused widespread devastation across the Southeastern United States, causing $78.7 billion in damages, with $59.6 billion occurring in North Carolina. Other significant weather events were Typhoon Yagi, which caused extensive damage in Southeast Asia and South China, leaving over 840 people dead and causing $14.7 billion in damages, and Hurricane Milton, which became the most intense Atlantic hurricane in the Gulf of Mexico, tying with Hurricane Rita in 2005. The storm inflicted $34.4 billion in damages and 45 deaths.

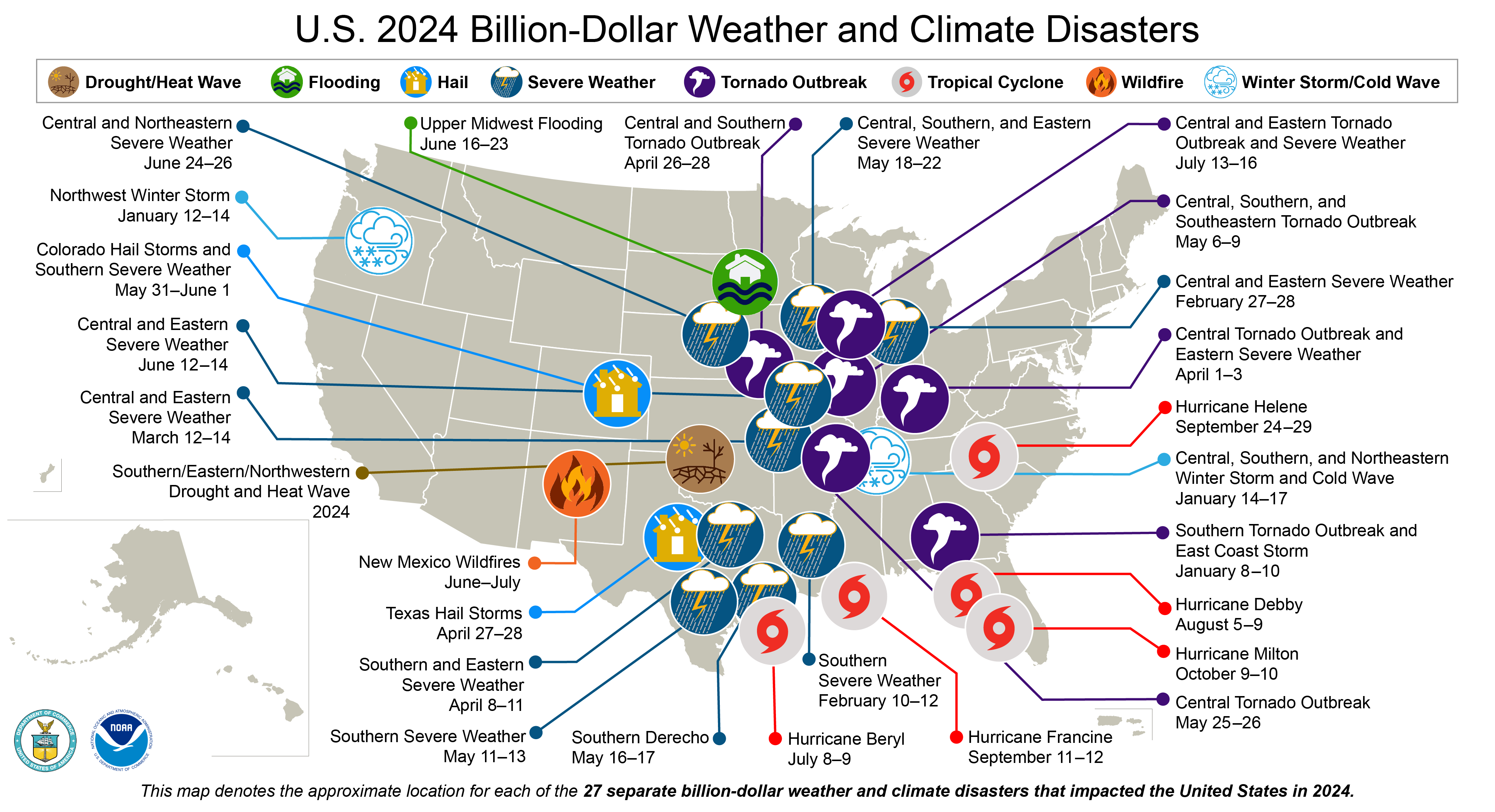
The 27 weather and climate disaster events in the United States with losses exceeding $1 billion in 2024

== Deadliest events ==
Deadliest meteorological events during 2024
Rank	Event	Date(s)	Deaths	Refs
1	2024 Japan heatwaves	April 1 – September 30	2,033	
2	2024 West African floods	June 6–21	1,500+	
3	2024 North America heat waves	March 17 – September 17	1,161	
4	2024 Afghanistan–Pakistan floods	March 6 – September 4	1,084	
5	2024 Hajj extreme heat disaster	June 14–19	1,301+	
6	Typhoon Yagi (Enteng)	August 31 — September 9	844-1,009	
7	2024 Enga landslide	May 24	670–2,000+	
8	2024 Pakistan heat wave	May 21 – July	568	
9	2024 Kenya–Tanzania floods	April 18 – early May	461	
10	2024 Wayanad landslides	July 30	254	
11	Hurricane Helene	September 24–27	252	

== Types ==
The following listed different types of special weather conditions worldwide.

=== Cold snaps and winter storms ===
On February 19, following a heavy snow, an avalanche in Afghanistan's Nuristan Province killed 25 people.

=== Heat waves and droughts ===
2024 Southeast Asia heat wave

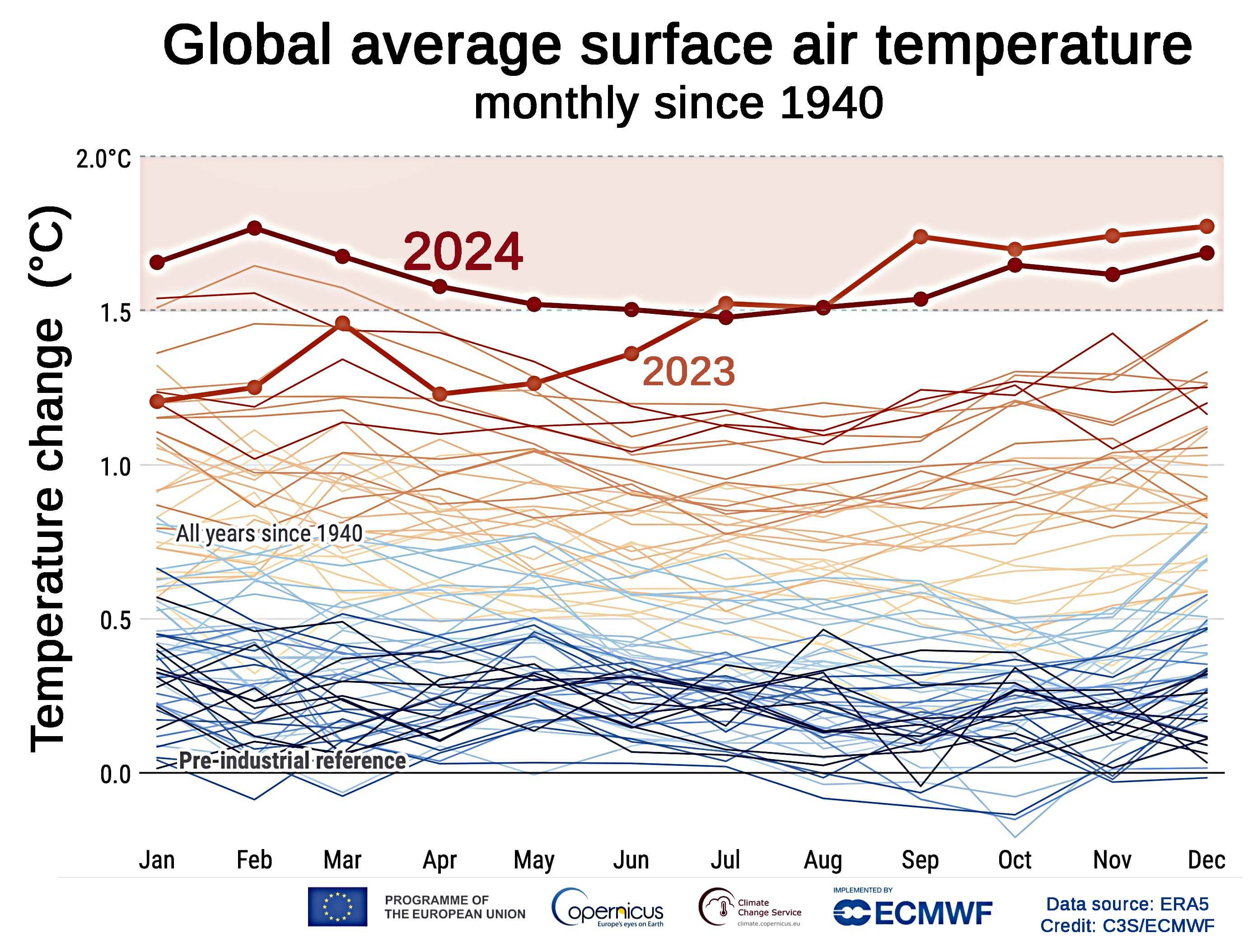
In 2024, Earth saw the highest average annual surface air temperature ever recorded, outpacing 2023 on an average basis.

Scientists in extreme event attribution have concluded that in virtually all countries and territories in the year beginning in May 2024, human-caused global warming increased the number of days of extreme heat events over long-term norms.

From 2023 to 2024, the concentration of atmospheric carbon dioxide—among the greenhouse gases that cause global warming—increased by 3.5 ppm, the largest one-year increase since modern measurements began in 1957.

For the first time, in each month in a 12-month period (through June 2024), Earth’s average temperature exceeded 1.50 °C (2.70 °F) above the pre-industrial baseline.

In a near-record heat wave, temperatures in Antarctica reached 28 °C (50 °F) above normal on certain days.

The global average surface temperature in August 2024 was 1.51 °C (2.72 °F) above the pre-industrial level—the 13th month in a 14-month period for which it exceeded the 1.50 °C (2.70 °F) threshold.

As reported in September, Brazil was experiencing its worst drought on record, affecting at least 59% of the country.

For the week of October 23-28, 48 U.S. states were experiencing at least moderate drought, the greatest number of states in U.S. Drought Monitor history.

=== Tornadoes ===
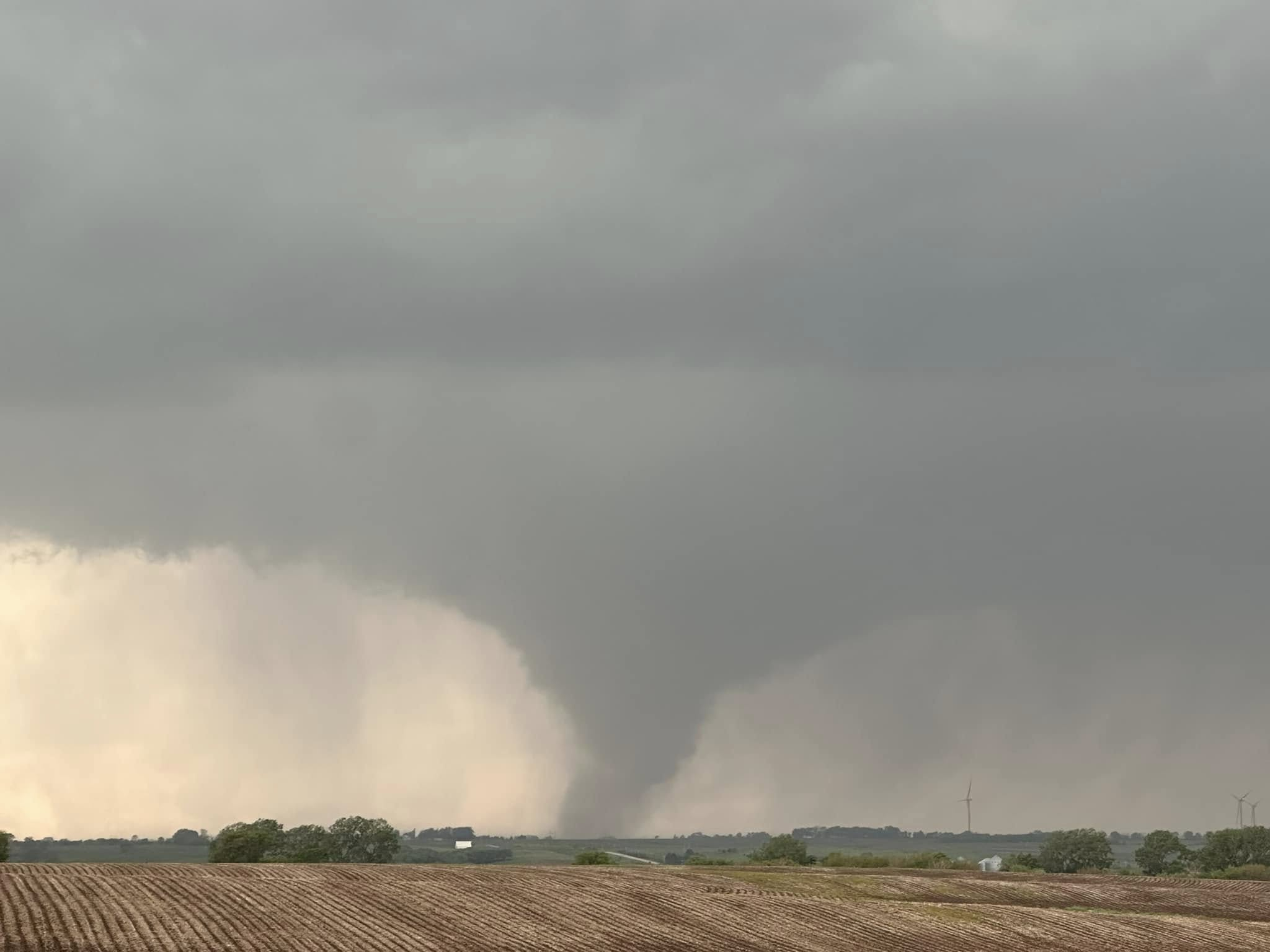
An EF4 tornado seen to the southeast of Greenfield, Iowa on May 21.

There have been 1,880 preliminary filtered reports of tornadoes in the United States in 2024, of which at least 1,796 have been confirmed. Worldwide, at least 90 tornado-related deaths have been confirmed – 53 in the United States, 14 in China, 12 in South Africa, 5 in India, 3 in Indonesia, 2 in Mexico and 1 in Russia.

=== Tropical and subtropical cyclones ===
Climate change's increase of water temperatures intensified peak wind speeds in all eleven 2024 Atlantic hurricanes.

The 2024 hurricane season saw an early flareup of activity including the earliest Category 5 storm on record, an unusual mid-season pause, and a final flareup to end the season.

On January 1, Tropical Storm Alvaro made landfall in Madagascar. Alvaro would kill nineteen people. After a lull in activity, Cyclone Belal would form, bringing heavy wind to the islands of Mauritius and Réunion. A few days later, Tropical Storm Candice would form.

Hurricane Beryl, the earliest Category 5 storm on record in the Atlantic (forming 28 June and reaching Category 5 on 1 July), broke records for rapid intensification 65 mph (105 km/h) in 24 hours), overall strength, and location for June. The system killed 73 people.

Hurricane Helene in September made landfall near Perry, Florida as a Category 4 hurricane with winds of 140 mph (230 km/h), Killing 252 people, making it the deadliest hurricane in the continental U.S. since Hurricane Katrina. In the southern Appalachians, up to 30 in (76 cm) of rain fell, leading to the National Weather Service having to issue 34 flash flood emergencies. In Mount Mitchell, North Carolina, a 106 mph (171 km/h) gust was recorded, followed by 100 mph (160 km/h) in Alma, Georgia, and 99 mph (159 km/h) in Perry, Florida. In the Tampa–St. Petersburg area, storm surge up to 7.3 ft (2.2 m) was measured, while 12–16 ft (3.7–4.9 m) of surge was measured in Keaton Beach and Steinhatchee, where 80 percent of buildings were destroyed.

=== Extratropical cyclones and European windstorms ===
The first European windstorm of 2024 was Storm Henk, which was named by the Met Office on 2 January 2024 and subsequently Annelie by the FUB the same day, due to the threat of very strong winds.

=== Wildfires ===
The Park Fire was ignited by arson north of Chico, California on July 24. The fire destroyed 709 structures and damaged 54 others and rapidly spread to 429,603 acres.

In September, there were a few wildfires burning outside Los Angeles and San Bernardino, the Line Fire, Bridge Fire, and Airport Fire. They were fueled by strong winds and hot, dry conditions.

== Timeline ==
This is a timeline of weather events during 2024.

=== January ===
- December 30 – January 3 – Tropical Storm Alvaro kills nineteen people.
- January 2–5 – European windstorm Hank (Annelie)
- January 2–6 – 2024 France floods of January
- January 6–7 – January 2024 nor'easter
- January 8–10 – January 8-10, 2024 North American storm complex
- January 10–13 – January 10–13, 2024 North American storm complex
- January 11–18 – Cyclone Belal
- January 12 – 2024 El Carmen de Atrato landslide
- January 12–25 – Cyclone Kirrily
- January 13–16 – January 13-16, 2024 North American winter storm
- January 23–31 – 2024 Colombia wildfires

=== February ===
- February 1–5 – 2024 Chile wildfires
- February 4–7 – February 2024 California atmospheric rivers
- February 6 – 2024 Davao de Oro landslide
- February 10–18 – February 2024 nor'easter
- February 14 – March 6 – 2024 Port Hills fire in New Zealand
- February 19 – an avalanche in Afghanistan's Nuristan Province kills 25 people.
- February 21–26 – Cyclone Rae
- February 26 – March 16 – Smokehouse Creek Fire in Texas and Oklahoma
- February 29 – present – Pakistan floods

=== March ===
- March–September – 2024 Russian wildfires
- March 6 – September 4 – 2024 Afghanistan–Pakistan floods
- March 7–13 – 2024 Sumatra flash floods
- March 11 – 2024 France floods of March 11
- March 13–15 – Tornado outbreak of March 13–15, 2024
- March 17 – September 27 – 2024 North America heat waves
- March 18–22 – 2024 Papua New Guinea floods
- March 18 – May 20 – 2024 Kenya–Tanzania floods
- March 31 – 2024 France floods of March 31

=== April ===
- April–June – 2024 Indian heat wave
- April–October – 2024 Japan heatwaves
- April 1–30 – 2024 Central Asian floods
- April 1 – May 2 – 2024 Bangladesh heatwave
- April 1 – May 7 – 2024 Southeast Asia heat wave
- April 4–9 – European windstorm Kathleen (Timea), which caused extensive flooding in the U.K. and, to a lesser degree, in Ireland
- April 5 – Orsk Dam collapse
- April 14–17 – 2024 Persian Gulf floods
- April 16 – 2024 United Arab Emirates floods
- April 16–28 – 2024 Guangdong floods
- April 20 – May 13 – Little Yamsay Fire in Oregon
- April 25–28 – Tornado outbreak of April 25–28, 2024
- April 27 – May 20 – 2024 Rio Grande do Sul floods in Brazil
- April 29 – 2024 Mai Mahiu flash flood

=== May ===
- May 6–10 – Tornado outbreak of May 6–10, 2024
- May 11–12 – 2024 West Sumatra floods
- May 14–31 – Spruce Creek Fire in Colorado
- May 15–16 – 2024 Houston derecho
- May 15–31 – 2024 Pakistan heat wave
- May 18 – June 3 – Wildcat Fire in Arizona
- May 19–22 – Tornado outbreak of May 19–22, 2024
- May 23–30 – Typhoon Ewiniar
- May 24 – 2024 Enga landslide
- May 24–28 – Cyclone Remal
- May 25–27 – Tornado outbreak of May 25–27, 2024
- May 26 – 2024 Armenia–Georgia floods
- May 30 – June 13 – 2024 Germany floods

=== June ===
- June–August – 2024 European heatwaves
- June 1–5 – June 2024 South African storm complex
- June 1–30 – 2024 Switzerland floods
- June 2–10 – Adams Fire in Arizona
- June 8 – October 5 – Pioneer Fire in Washington
- June 11–14 – June 2024 South Florida floods
- June 14–19 – 2024 Hajj disaster
- June 15–26 – Post Fire in California
- June 16 – 2024 Baños landslide
- June 16–24 – Point Fire in California
- June 17–19 – Tropical Storm Alberto
- June 17 – July 15 – South Fork Fire in New Mexico
- June 17 – August 26 – Salt Fire in New Mexico
- June 26 – July 5 – Pizona Fire in Nevada
- June 26 – July 20 – Basin Fire in California
- June 28 – July 11 – Hurricane Beryl
- June 29–30 – 2024 Switzerland floods of 29-30 June
- June 30 – July 1 – Tropical Storm Chris

=== July ===
- July–October – 2024 Peru wildfires
- July 2–8 – Thompson Fire in California
- July 4 – 2024 Lekki flood
- July 5 – August 4 – Lake Fire in California
- July 6 – 2024 Sulawesi landslide
- July 8–10 – Hurricane Beryl tornado outbreak
- July 10–17 – Watch Fire in Arizona
- July 11–18 – Freeman Fire in Arizona
- July 12 – Madan Ashrit Highway disaster
- July 13–16 – Severe weather sequence of July 13–16, 2024
- July 17 – August 15 – Swawilla Fire in Washington
- July 19–27 – Typhoon Gaemi
- July 20–25 – Tropical Storm Prapiroon
- July 21–22 – 2024 Gofa landslides
- July 22 – April 1 – 2024 Jasper wildfire in Alberta
- July 24 – September 26 – Park Fire
- July 24 – October – 2024 Sudan floods
- July 25–30 – Waterman Fire in Arizona
- July 28 – August 16 – 2024 Yemen floods
- July 29 – August 7 – Nixon Fire in California
- July 29 – August 11 – Alexander Mountain Fire in Colorado
- July 30 – 2024 Wayanad landslides
- July 30 – August 8 – Pedro Fire in California

=== August ===
- August 3–8 – Hurricane Debby
- August 3 – December 16 – Coffee Pot Fire in California
- August 5 – 2024 Wolayita landslide
- August 5–14 – Tropical Storm Maria
- August 6–19 – Element Fire in Arizona
- August 9 – September 20 – Boise Fire in California
- August 11–15 – 2024 Attica wildfires
- August 11–19 – Typhoon Ampil
- August 12–20 – Hurricane Ernesto
- August 16 – 2024 Thame flood
- August 20 – September 1 – Typhoon Shanshan
- August 21–29 – August 2024 Bangladesh floods
- August 25 – September 2 – Cyclone Asna
- August 29 – September 11 – 2024 Ecuador wildfires
- August 31 – September 9 – Typhoon Yagi
- August 31 – September 9 – 2024 Vijayawada floods

=== September ===
- September 5 – December 23 – Line Fire in California
- September 8 – November 26 – Bridge Fire in California
- September 9 – October 5 – Airport Fire in California
- September 9–12 – Hurricane Francine
- September 9–18 – Typhoon Bebinca
- September 10 – Borno State flooding
- September 13–18 – Deep Depression BOB 05
- September 14–21 – Central European floods
- September 15–17 – Potential Tropical Cyclone Eight (2024)
- September 15–20 – Tropical Storm Soulik
- September 15–21 – Tropical Storm Pulasan
- September 22–27 – Hurricane John
- September 24–27 – Hurricane Helene
- September 26 – 2024 Jivitputrika tragedy
- September 26 – October 3 – Typhoon Krathon
- September 29 – October 7 – Hurricane Kirk

=== October ===
- October 2–4 – 2024 Otago floods
- October 3–4 – 2024 Bosnia and Herzegovina floods
- October 5–10 – Hurricane Milton
  - October 8–9 – Hurricane Milton tornado outbreak
- October 18–20 – 2024 British Columbia floods
- October 18–29 – Tropical Storm Trami
- October 19–20 – Tropical Storm Nadine
- October 19–22 – Hurricane Oscar
- October 19–29 – Tropical Storm Trami
- October 22–26 – Cyclone Dana
- October 24 – November 1 – Typhoon Kong-rey
- October 29 – November 16 – 2024 Spanish floods
- October 30 – December 12 – Horseshoe Fire in California

=== November ===
- November 2–5 – Tornado outbreak of November 2–5, 2024
- November 2–12 – Typhoon Yinxing
- November 4–10 – Hurricane Rafael
- November 6–27 – Mountain Fire in California
- November 7–20 – Typhoon Man-yi
- November 8–15 – Typhoon Toraji
- November 9–16 – Typhoon Usagi
- November 14–18 – Tropical Storm Sara
- November 18–22 – November 2024 Northeast Pacific bomb cyclone
- November 18–30 – Cyclone Robyn
- November 25 – December 1 – Cyclone Fengal
- November 26–29 – 2024 South Korean snowstorm
- November 28 – 2024 Ugandan landslides

=== December ===
- December 5–9 – Storm Darragh
- December 7–16 – Cyclone Chido
- December 9–18 – Franklin Fire in California
- December 21–25 – Tropical Storm Pabuk
- December 28–29 – Tornado outbreak of December 28–29, 2024

== See also ==
- Weather of 2026
- Weather of 2025
- Weather of 2023
- Weather of 2022
- Weather of 2021

Global weather by year
Preceded by 2023	Weather of 2024	Succeeded by 2025
