= Asif Bashir =

Pakistani rescue worker

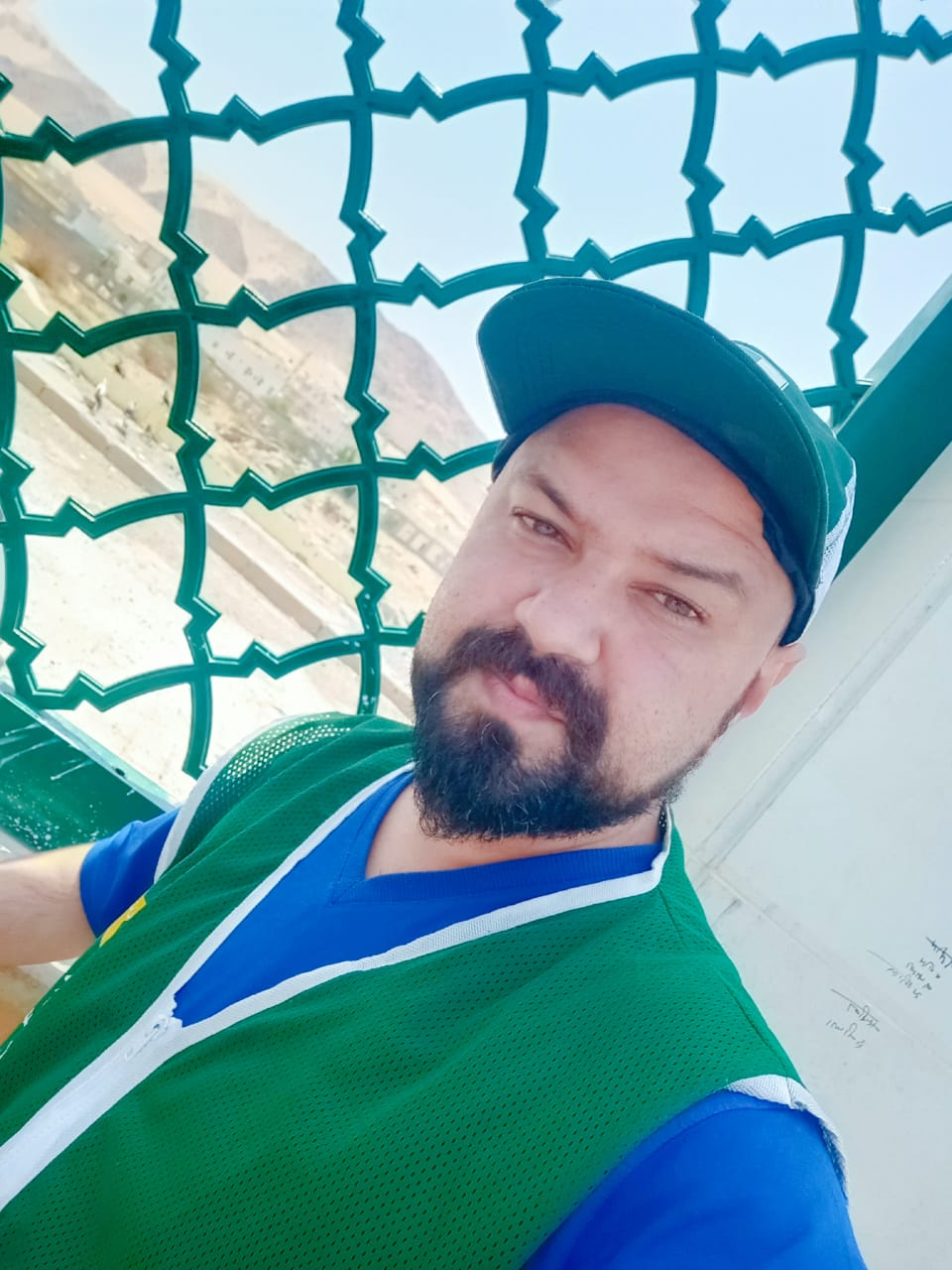
- Bashir in Maidan-e-Badar, Saudi Arabia
- Citizenship: (Pakistan) Pakistani
- Occupations: Rescue worker, Volunteer
- Known for: 2024 Hajj extreme heat disaster
- Awards: Jeevan Raksha Padak (India); Sitara-e-Imtiaz (Pakistan); Nominated for King's Gallantry Medal (UK)

Asif Bashir (Pashto, Urdu: آصف بشیر) is a Pakistani rescue worker, volunteer and philanthropist from Peshawar, Pakistan who gained national and international recognition for his role in the rescue of 17 pilgrims during the 2024 Hajj extreme heat disaster.

== Early life and career ==
Asif Bashir was born in Peshawar, Pakistan. He graduated from COMSATS University with a degree in Computer Systems Engineering. Currently, he is employed as a Database Supervisor at the Chief Minister's Secretariat. Prior to this role, he worked at the Deputy Commissioner's Office as a rescue worker. His involvement in rescue services and disaster management spans several years, during which he has volunteered in various capacities, including flood and avalanche relief operations.

== 2024 Hajj pilgrimage incident ==
On June 22, 2024, during extreme heat conditions, Asif Bashir participated in the rescue of 17 Indian, British, and Canadian nationals affected by severe weather. While serving as a guide volunteer, he provided medical assistance to over 360 individuals by distributing water and oral rehydration salts (ORS). He also transported 26 pilgrims to a nearby hospital, carrying some over a distance of 4 to 5 kilometers. Bashir's actions were recognized with titles such as 'Angel of Mina' and 'Pakistani Bajrangi Bhaijan.' His efforts were acknowledged by the Government of India.

== Aftermath ==
Following his actions during the 2024 Hajj pilgrimage, Asif Bashir received recognition both nationally and internationally. His efforts were acknowledged by several governments and organizations, leading to numerous accolades. The Government of India honored him with the Jeevan Raksha Padak, while the Government of Pakistan awarded him the Bravery Medal. Additionally, he was nominated for the King's Gallantry Medal by the British Government.

== See also ==
- 2024 Hajj extreme heat disaster
- Incidents during the Hajj
- 2015 Mina disaster
- Bajrangi Bhaijaan
