= Potential Tropical Cyclone Eight (2024) =

Atlantic potential tropical cyclone in 2024

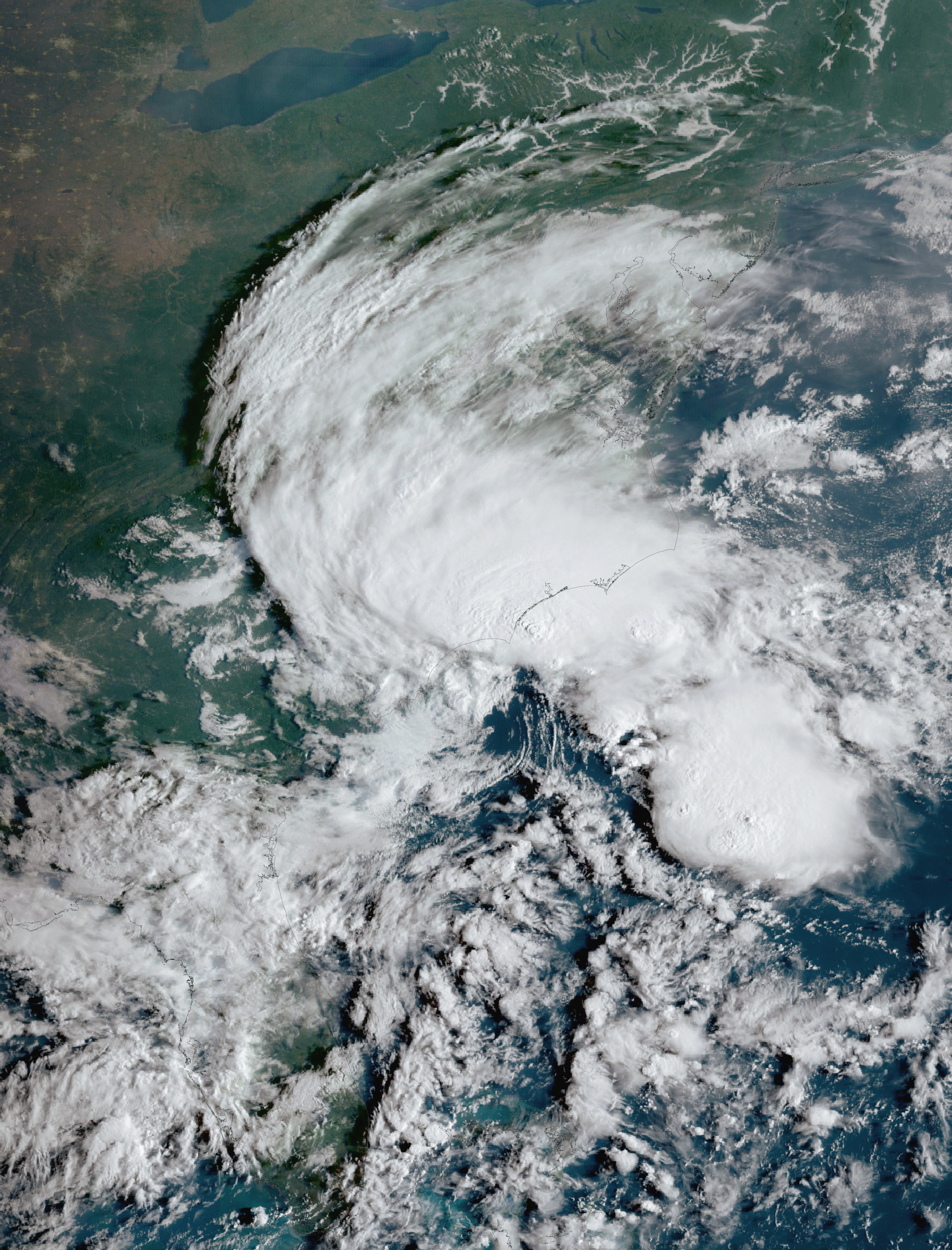
- Potential Tropical Cyclone Eight at peak intensity on August 28 off the North Carolina coast

Meteorological history
- Formed: September 15, 2024
- Dissipated: September 17, 2024

Potential tropical cyclone
- 1-minute sustained (SSHWS/NWS)
- Highest winds: 60 mph (95 km/h)
- Lowest pressure: 1004 mbar (hPa); 29.65 inHg

Overall effects
- Fatalities: 1 indirect
- Damage: $50–100 million (2024 USD)
- Areas affected: East Coast of the United States
- Part of the 2024 Atlantic hurricane season

Potential Tropical Cyclone Eight was a non-tropical weather system that brought significant flooding to portions of North Carolina in mid-September 2024. The eighth tropical disturbance designated by the National Hurricane Center (NHC) during the 2024 Atlantic hurricane season formed from a stalled frontal boundary off the coast of South Carolina. A gale-force, extratropical low began to form along the frontal boundary while slowly drifting toward to the coast of South Carolina and the NHC began to initiate advisories on Potential Tropical Cyclone Eight on September 15. The system began to gradually strengthen early on September 16, and peaked with maximum sustained winds of 60 mph (95 km/h) and a minimum central pressure of 1004 mbar (29.65 inHg). However, the low failed to develop into a tropical cyclone as it did not shed its frontal characteristics and never developed a closed center of circulation. The system then moved inland and dissipated the next day.

A tropical storm warning was issued for the coasts of South Carolina and North Carolina on September 15. Over 20 in (510 mm) of rain fell in some coastal portions of North Carolina leading to widespread flooding and damage. Over 100 homes were destroyed, at least 100 people were rescued and numerous roads were damaged, isolating local communities. Overall, the storm killed one person and caused more than $50 million (2024 USD) worth of damage.

== Meteorological history ==
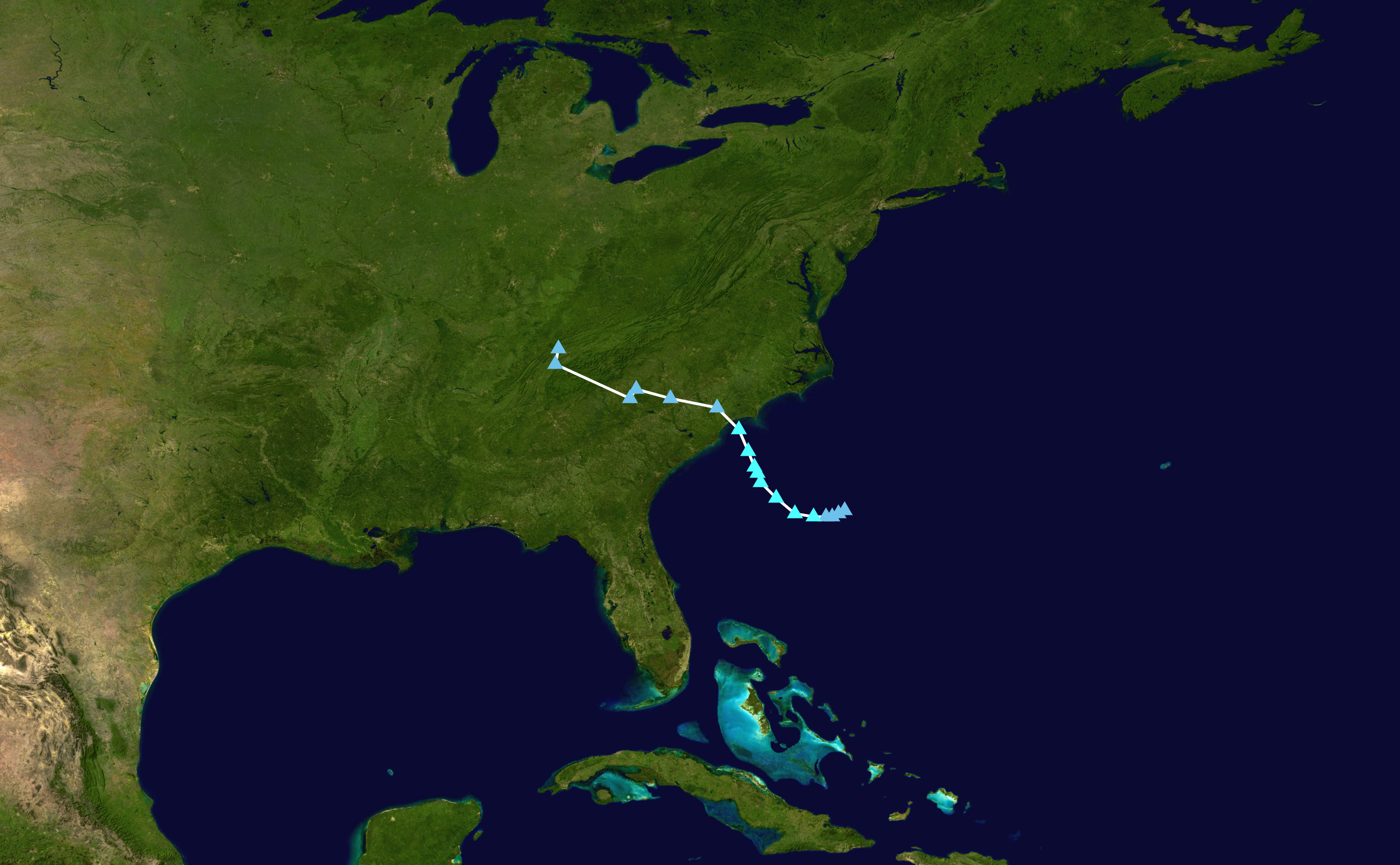
Map plotting the storm's track and intensity, according to the Saffir–Simpson scale Map key Saffir–Simpson scale Tropical depression (≤38 mph, ≤62 km/h) Tropical storm (39–73 mph, 63–118 km/h) Category 1 (74–95 mph, 119–153 km/h) Category 2 (96–110 mph, 154–177 km/h) Category 3 (111–129 mph, 178–208 km/h) Category 4 (130–156 mph, 209–251 km/h) Category 5 (≥157 mph, ≥252 km/h) Unknown Storm type Tropical cyclone Subtropical cyclone Extratropical cyclone, remnant low, tropical disturbance, or monsoon depression

On September 11, the NHC noted that a non-tropical low pressure system could form along a decaying frontal boundary located off the Carolina Coast. On September 13, an extratropical area of low pressure began to develop along the front and the NHC noted that the system could develop into a tropical cyclone. On September 15, the low was designated as Invest 95L and it slowly began to drift northward towards the coast of South Carolina. Later that day, the system began to develop a broad, low-level center of circulation, and the NHC designated the system as Potential Tropical Cyclone Eight with maximum sustained winds of 45 mph (72 km/h), located 125 mi (201 km) off the coast of South Carolina and initiated advisories due to its close proximity to land. The next day, the system began to gradually organize with convection beginning to develop around the center and northeast quadrant of the storm. Although the east-to-west temperature gradient within the system began to weaken, its center became more elongated as the storm began to slowly drift northwest due to the influence of a ridge along the northeastern United States. Despite the system strengthening and beginning to shed its frontal characteristics, its structure became even less organize with its low-level circulation became even more elongated. The convection within the system began to displace the northeast quadrant of the storm due to strong upper-level wind shear. The system later reached its peak intensity with maximum sustained winds of 60 mph (95 km/h) and a minimum central pressure of 1004 mbar (29.65 inHg) on September 16 at 12:00 UTC. However, increasing wind shear caused the strongest winds and convection within the system began to displace even more to the northeast and the system failed to fully shed its frontal characteristics. The system weakened while moving inland along the coast of northeastern South Carolina and dissipated the next day.

== Preparations, impact, and aftermath ==
When the system was first designated as Potential Tropical Cyclone Eight, tropical storm warnings were issued from Edisto Beach, South Carolina to Ocracoke Inlet, North Carolina. However, all warnings were eventually discontinued when the maximum sustained winds in the system fell below tropical storm force. Flood watches were issued for portions of North Carolina and South Carolina. Forecasters warned that coastal flooding from the system could be exacerbated by high tide. In North Carolina, schools canceled classes and government offices suspended operations. Brunswick County suspended garbage collection operations. A wind advisory was issued for Fayetteville. In Durham, several residents unclogged storm drains in anticipation of the storm. In Myrtle Beach, South Carolina, Surfside Beach Pier and an animal care center were closed preceding the storm.

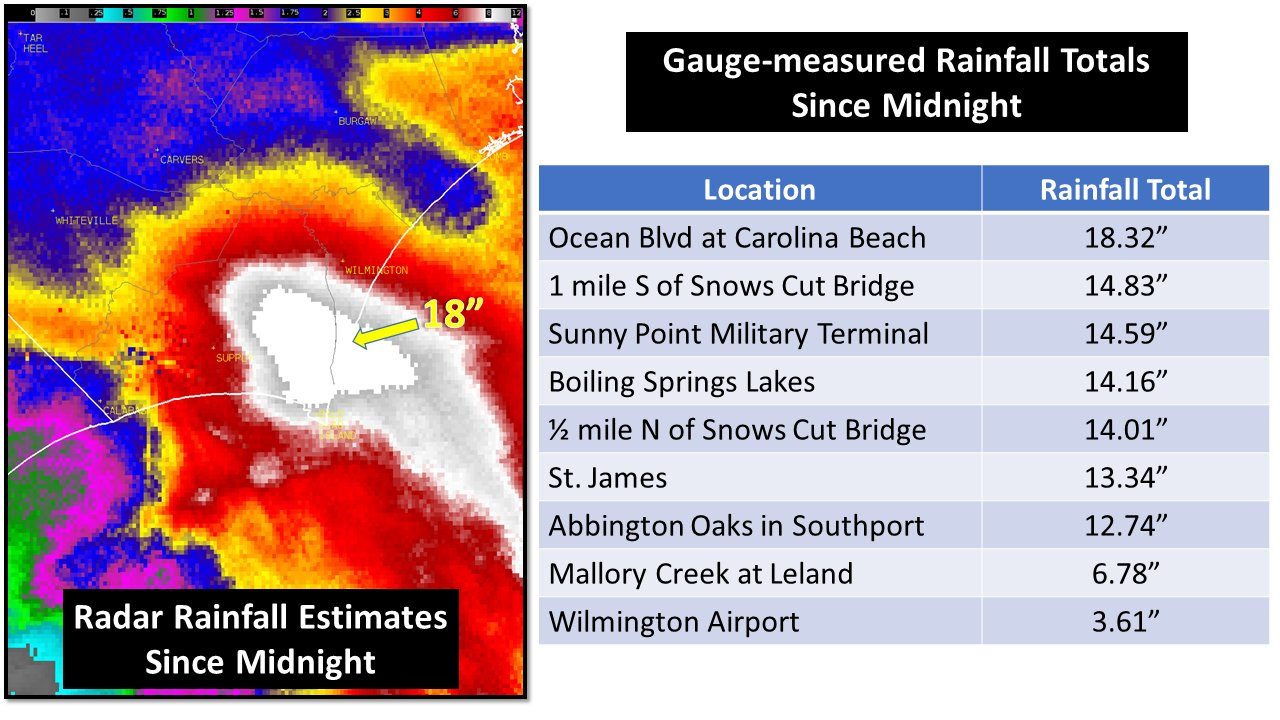
Rainfall totals with Potential Tropical Cyclone Eight

Throughout coastal regions of North Carolina, especially in Brunswick County and New Hanover County, severe flood damage was reported. Several officials considered the event historic, being a "one-in-a-thousand-year flood" and "as bad as Hurricane Florence" in September 2018. A maximum rainfall total of 20.81 in (529 mm) was reported in Carolina Beach with secondary totals of 19.13 in (486 mm) and 18.65 in (474 mm) in Brunswick County. Wrightsville Beach saw a storm surge of 2.55 ft (0.78 m). In Sunny Point, North Carolina, winds gusted up to 77 mph (124 km/h), while Wrightsville Beach and Masonboro Island saw wind gusts of 67 mph (108 km/h) and 64 mph (103 km/h), respectively. Two EF0 tornadoes were reported during the storm, one near Bald Head Island and another in Emerald Isle, with the latter causing minor roof damage to a few structures. At least 50 major roadways, such as portions of North Carolina Highway 211, U.S. Route 17, North Carolina Highway 133, and North Carolina Highway 12 were severely damaged by floodwaters, some of which not reopening until September 2025. Three bridges and an overpass were destroyed. Several communities along the Burnswick County Islands were isolated after floodwaters destroyed access roads. Lake Park Boulevard in Carolina Beach was flooded up to 4 ft (1.2 m), forcing one driver to abandon their vehicle. Road damage forced the closure of the Southport-Fort Fisher ferry. Several businesses in Southport suffered commercial losses from road closures. A bridge collapsed, causing a car to fall into an overflowing river. Beach erosion up to 5 to 6 feet was reported in Wrightsville Beach. Strong winds downed trees and damaged several business signs. Throughout the state, at least 120 people, 24 of whom in Kure Beach, were rescued from homes and stranded vehicles. Two women and a child were rescued after their vehicle stalled in the floodwaters. Additionally, three tourists were rescued after attempting to flee their flooded Airbnb.

Several businesses in Carolina Beach were flooded up to 3 ft (0.91 m). A market and parking lot were inundated, damaging several cars. Carolina Beach Mayor Lynn Barbee reported there were at least 100 reports of property damage. Damage citywide totaled to more than US$10 million. More than 100 homes were damaged statewide. In Leland, at least 19 homes were damaged by floodwaters. One resident's yard was flooded up to 6 ft (1.8 m). Poor drainage in several communities exacerbated the flooding. One home was destroyed after a lightning strike ignited a fire. In Winnabow, one home suffered major flood damage from the storm, with estimates to repair the damage at US$15,000. In the Outer Banks, storm surge exacerbated by high tide damaged several coastal homes. Several children were evacuated after floodwaters began to rise in an elementary school. In Morehead City, the parking lot of a Lowe's was flooded, damaging several vehicles. The parking lot of the Brunswick County Courthouse was completely flooded. In Brunswick County, flooding damaged several water mains, forcing officials to shut off wastewater services and issue boil-water advisories. An 80-year-old man drowned after attempting to drive through floodwaters. A curfew was instated due to widespread flooding and damage. A pickup truck slid into a trailer as a result of slippery roads, injuring several people. In Orange County, over 1,000 homes were left without power at the height of the storm. Aon estimated losses to be at $130 million, while the NHC noted other damage estimates ranging from $50–100 million. The Dan River rose to 8 in (200 mm) above flood stage.

In Virginia, remnant moisture from the system produced an average of 1.5-2.5 inches of rain in some areas. A portion of a driveway was washed out by floodwaters. Several major roadways were closed after being inundated by floodwaters. Northeastern Florida reported rip currents and waves up to 4–6 feet. In Myrtle Beach, South Carolina, coastal flooding was reported, inundating several roadways.

Governor of North Carolina Roy Cooper declared a state of emergency following the storm. In Carolina Beach, US$800,000 were allocated for debris removal and repairs. Burnswick county allocated US$3.2 million to rebuild roads that were destroyed during the storm. Overall, repairs to the damaged roads costed more than US$9 million. A disaster declaration was issued for Burnswick, New Hanover, and Onslow counties. Loans were given out to several business and home owners. Kure Beach spent US$900,000 to support recovery efforts from the storm. In Onslow County, a US$2.94 million project was approved to use 61,000 cubic yards of sand to rebuild dunes that were destroyed during the storm.

== See also ==
- Weather of 2024
- Tropical cyclones in 2024
