= 2024 West Sumatra floods =

Flooding in Indonesia

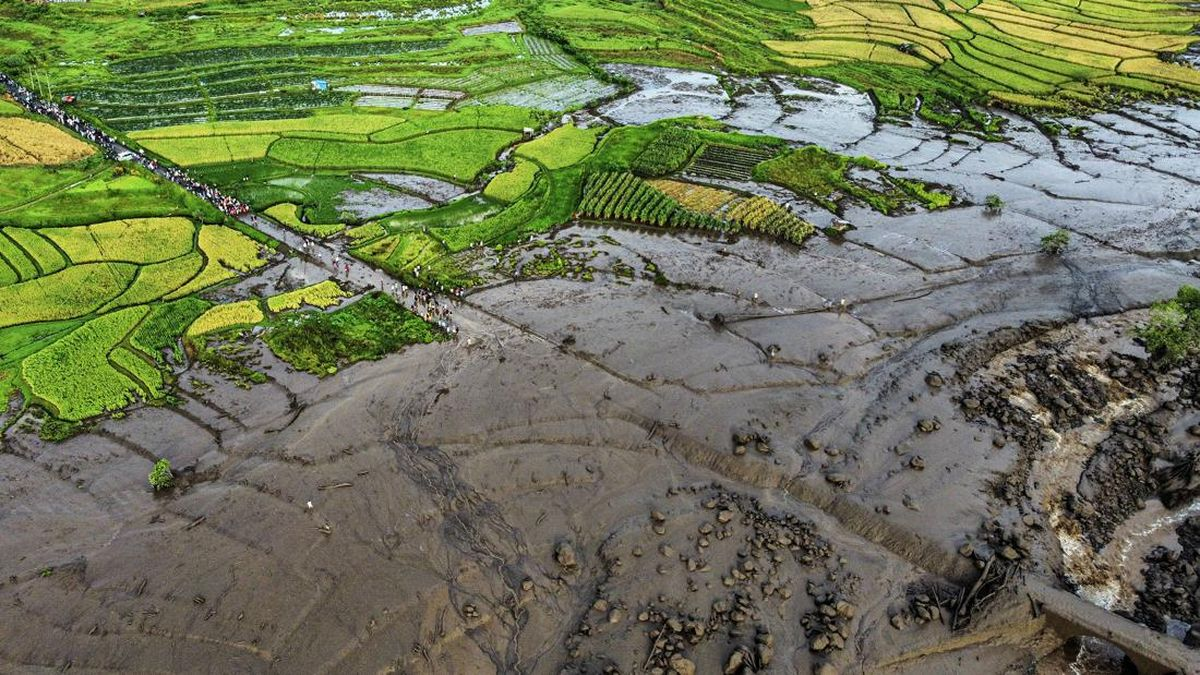
- Date: 11 May – 12 May 2024
- Location: West Sumatra, Indonesia
- Cause: Heavy rain
- Deaths: 67
- Missing: 20

Beginning on 11 May 2024, heavy rain caused flash floods and lahars in West Sumatra, Indonesia, killing at least 67 people and leaving 20 more missing. More than 4,000 people were also displaced. The regencies of Agam and Tanah Datar were most affected.

== Events ==
Hours of heavy monsoon rains caused flash flooding at around 22:30 WIB (15:30 UTC) on 11 May, exacerbated by a lahar from Mount Marapi. The rains also caused a river to overflow and flood villages in four districts. The lahar swept down Mount Marapi, carrying a wet mixture of ash and rocks. It buried homes and swept some residents away.

== Damage and casualties ==
At least 67 people died, 44 were injured and 20 remained missing. Among the dead included 22 in Agam Regency (19 of them in Canduang), 29 in Tanah Datar, 12 in Padang Pariaman, two in Padang Panjang and two in Padang.

At least 521 houses, 31,985 hectares of land including rice fields, 19 bridges and most major roads were damaged in three districts and one town. The flood also swept away people and more than 100 houses and buildings were submerged. In Tanah Datar, several mosques and almost 200 buildings were damaged. Two trucks were also swept away by the floods. In Agam, dozens of homes were also damaged and 159 people were evacuated to nearby schools. A number of national roads were also affected, cutting off access between the major cities.

== Response ==
The BNPB declared a 14-day state of emergency in West Sumatra and distributed a total of Rp 3.2 billion in aid to local governments affected by the floods. They were also involved in searching for missing people in areas near rivers and clearing important roads from large rocks, debris and mud due to flooding. Excavators were deployed to remove large rocks and trees. As of 16 May, rescue work was ongoing to search for the missing. Abdul Malik, chief of the provincial rescue team, said that 400 personnel, eight excavators and drones were deployed to assist in the search for missing people.

The local government set up evacuation centres in the worst affected areas, and rescue teams have deployed rubber boats in search of survivors. West Sumatra governor Mahyeldi Ansharullah offered condolences and has instructed authorities to collaborate with the response. More than 4,000 residents were displaced and sought refuge at shelters or nearby infrastructure. The BNPB said the government intend to relocate those who could not return to their homes. The agency's head said new homes would be ready in six months, numbering around 200.

Indonesia's meteorological agency, BMKG, used cloud seeding to prevent rain clouds from reaching the worst-hit areas. On 16 May, the agency forecasted rain in the next few days to week which prompted them to deploy an air force aircraft to release salt flares in an attempt to disperse rain clouds. A BMKG spokesperson said 15 tons of salt was allocated for the mission. Two cloud seeding operations were completed on 16 May.

On 26 May, the BNPB, BMKG and PVMBG agencies planned on creating an early warning system in West Sumatra as a result of the floods, installing early warning systems at 23 locations across Agam, Tanah Datar and Padang Panjang.

== See also ==
- 2020 Jakarta floods
- 2024 in Indonesia
- 2024 Sumatra flash floods
- 2024 Sulawesi landslide
- List of floods
