= 2024 Switzerland floods =

2024 Natural disaster in Switzerland

- Part of 2024 European floods
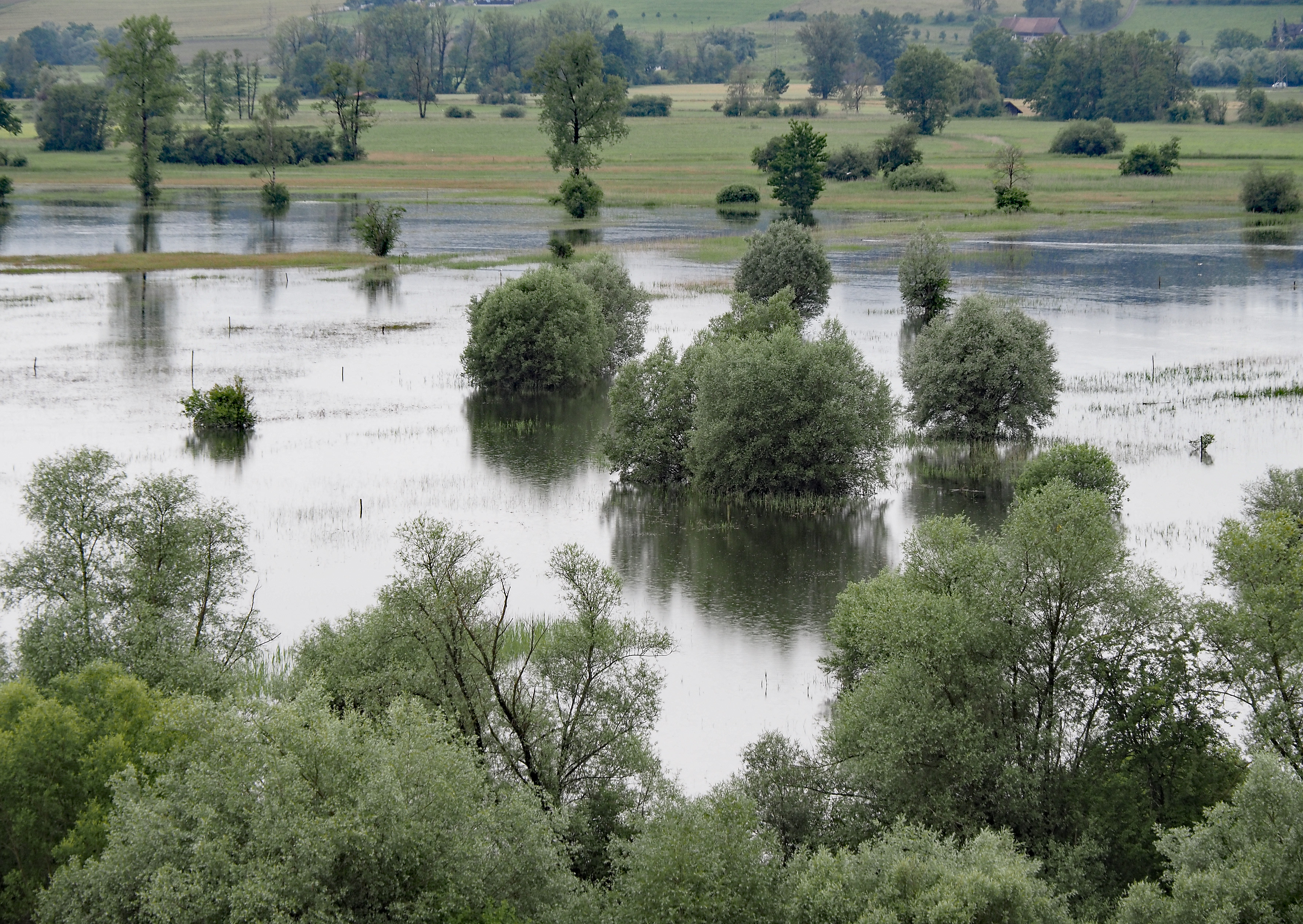
- Flooding of the Maschwander Allmend in the canton of Zug
- Date: 1 – 30 June 2024
- Type: Heavy rainfall
- Deaths: 18

In June 2024, a series of storms such as storms caused major damage in various regions of Switzerland through flooding, landslides, and mudslides and claimed at least eighteen lives. The disruption to the transport infrastructure also has an impact on transit traffic with the interruption of the A13 motorway and on tourism in parts of the Swiss Alps.

== Floods from 1 June ==
In early June, there was heavy rainfall, especially in southern Germany, but also in neighboring regions, which caused flooding in numerous regions. Rivers such as the Rhine and the Reuss caused local flooding, the water level in Lake Constance rose; danger levels 4 and 5 (high and very high danger) were reached, respectively, before being lowered to level 3. The danger on Lake Constance remained elevated until the end of June. The ground was still wet in many places; there was a lot of fresh snow in the high mountains.

Heavy rainfall, especially on Saturday, 1 June and Monday, 3 June, caused rivers and lakes to rise; there was a flood alert on the Sitter and Goldach in eastern Switzerland, danger level 3 (significant danger) was in effect on Lake Constance and the Upper Rhine, and danger level 4 (high danger) on Lake Constance on 4 June. the Untersee in Berlingen and the Rhine in Bad Zurzach overflowed their banks. Lake Lauerz in the canton of Schwyz overflowed its banks and the flooding of the Reuss caused flooding on the Maschwander Allmend in the cantons of Zug and Zurich. In the cantons of Zurich (450 operations), Thurgau (150 operations) and St. Gallen (90 operations), fire brigades were called out over the weekend because of water in buildings and flooded streets. Apart from the flooding, there were various landslides. In St. Gallen, the CSIO Nations Cup was cancelled on Friday. Compared to Bavaria, however, the whole thing went relatively smoothly, although heavier rainfall had been forecast beforehand.

Heavy rainfall on 9 and 10 June caused water levels to rise and local flooding throughout western and northern Switzerland. In addition to Lake Constance, there is also flooding on Lake Zurich and Lake Lucerne and their outflows. On 11 June, a flood warning of danger level 5 was issued for the Untersee, making it the highest of all danger levels (very high danger). On 13 June, the flood levels at Upper Lake and Lower Lake of Lake Constance were each at level 4; after a temporary easing, the water levels rose again during the storm on 21 June 2024.

== 21 and 22 June ==
Around 20 June, there was another weather situation with a low pressure area and a strong southerly flow, which brought moist air masses into the Alpine region. On Friday, 21 June 2024, a thunderstorm front brought persistent heavy rainfall in the Alpine region and also in the Jura Mountains and in areas near the border of neighboring countries. In the Grisons mountain valley of Valle Mesolcina, 125 mm of rain fell within 24 hours.

The unstable weather situation prevailed for several days; on the evening before 25 June, a heat thunderstorm brought large amounts of rain, especially in the canton of Vaud (117 mm in 3 hours in L'Auberson) and in the canton of Basel-Landschaft (53 mm in 3 hours in Liestal).

=== Rhine region ===
The flooding of the Rhine caused the water level of Lake Constance to rise again, as it had at the end of May 2024, so that the Swiss authorities declared danger level 4 for the lake shores and the Upper Rhine. All people were asked to stay away from the lake and river banks for their safety. Until Monday, 24 June, the water in Lake Constance continued to rise; at the Berlingen gauge on the Untersee, the water level was measured at 396.95 m above sea level (normal monthly average: 396.07 m above sea level).

=== Valais ===
In Valais, so much water flowed from the mountain torrents into the Rhône that it reached its highest levels near Sion and in the Lower Valais; at the Fully gauge station, a discharge of 819 m^{3}/s was measured on 22 June 2024, which corresponds to a once-in-a-century event. In the Chablais above Lake Geneva, the discharge of the Rhône temporarily reached 1200 m^{3}/s, according to information from the cantonal management staff of the canton of Vaud. At the mouth of the Rhône in Lake Geneva, large masses of driftwood collected on a floating barrier. In Chippis, more than 200 residents had to leave their houses in the vicinity of the river. The Nufenen Pass was temporarily closed on 21 June as a result of a landslide.

In Mattertal, the level of the Mattervispa rose so much that the stream flooded streets near the banks in Zermatt and the ground floors of several buildings. The Triftbach, which flows into the Mattervispa in the center of Zermatt, also overflowed its banks. Landslides interrupted the route of the Matterhorn Gotthard Bahn between Visp and Täsch and also the cantonal road in the Mattertal, so that Zermatt was cut off from the outside world. Near Randa, a mudslide from the village stream buried the main road, and near Herbriggen, a second mudslide buried the road and the railway line. In some places, the Mattervispa undermined the railway tracks. In Visp and Täsch, tourists who wanted to get to Zermatt or leave the Mattertal were blocked. The Gornergrat Railway also had to temporarily cease operations because the Riffelbord protective gallery had been damaged by a landslide. In the following days, the Matterhorn Gotthard Bahn reopened the line from Zermatt to Täsch, while buses ran between Täsch and Visp as a replacement for the interrupted railway line after the debris cones from the mudslides on the cantonal road had been cleared.

The most extensive damage in Valais was caused by flooding, mudslides and inundation in the Val d'Anniviers. The Navizence valley river carried about as much water as during the last serious flood event in 2018. The drinking water supply, sewage pipes and power lines of the holiday resort of Zinal were damaged. The cantonal road between Vissoie and Mayoux was temporarily impassable. The drinking water supply in Evolène was also disrupted.

=== Valle Mesolcina ===
In Valle Mesolcina, floods and mudslides caused severe damage over a length of 20 kilometers. The Moesa, which drains the valley to the Ticino, led to a rapid rise in the water level of 650 m^{3}/s at the Lumino/Sassello gauge station on the evening of 21 June 2024. During the night of 22 June, rock avalanches and masses of mud fell on several mountain slopes in the municipalities of Lostallo and Soazza, flooding cultivated land. The wastewater treatment plant in Lostallo was flooded, all four of the municipality's balancing basins were full of debris and had to be dredged. Several hydroelectric power plants owned by the energy company Axpo had to cease operations; dozens of people were evacuated from their homes.

In the hamlet of Sorte (430 m above sea level), three kilometres south of Lostallo, buildings were destroyed when a devastating mudslide from the Val de la Molera, on the west side of the Mesolcina beneath the Piz della Molera (2603 m above sea level) and the Piz de Groven (2694 m above sea level), flowed through the settlement. The Rià de la Molera torrent, or Riale Molera in Italian, begins in the mountain valley in the municipalities of Cama and Santa Maria in Calanca and flows into the Moesa from the right near Sorte, a district of the municipality of Lostallo; West of the river bridge (401 m above sea level), the younger part of the village, Campagna de Sort, stands on the old debris cone of the stream, which was created by earlier mudslides, on the Hauptstrasse 13 and at the former stop of the former Mesolcina railway. The mountains in this section of the Mesolcina consist of granite and gneiss formations. Because the water-soaked loose material in the Molera valley became unstable, a mud and rubble avalanche, which also carried away large boulders, started in the mountain area. The debris avalanche broke out of the previous stream bed, covered the meadow area and destroyed several houses in Sorte, interrupted the cantonal road and buried the western bridgehead of the Moesa bridge. At least one person from the hamlet lost their life, another person was rescued alive from a damaged house. Two people remain missing.

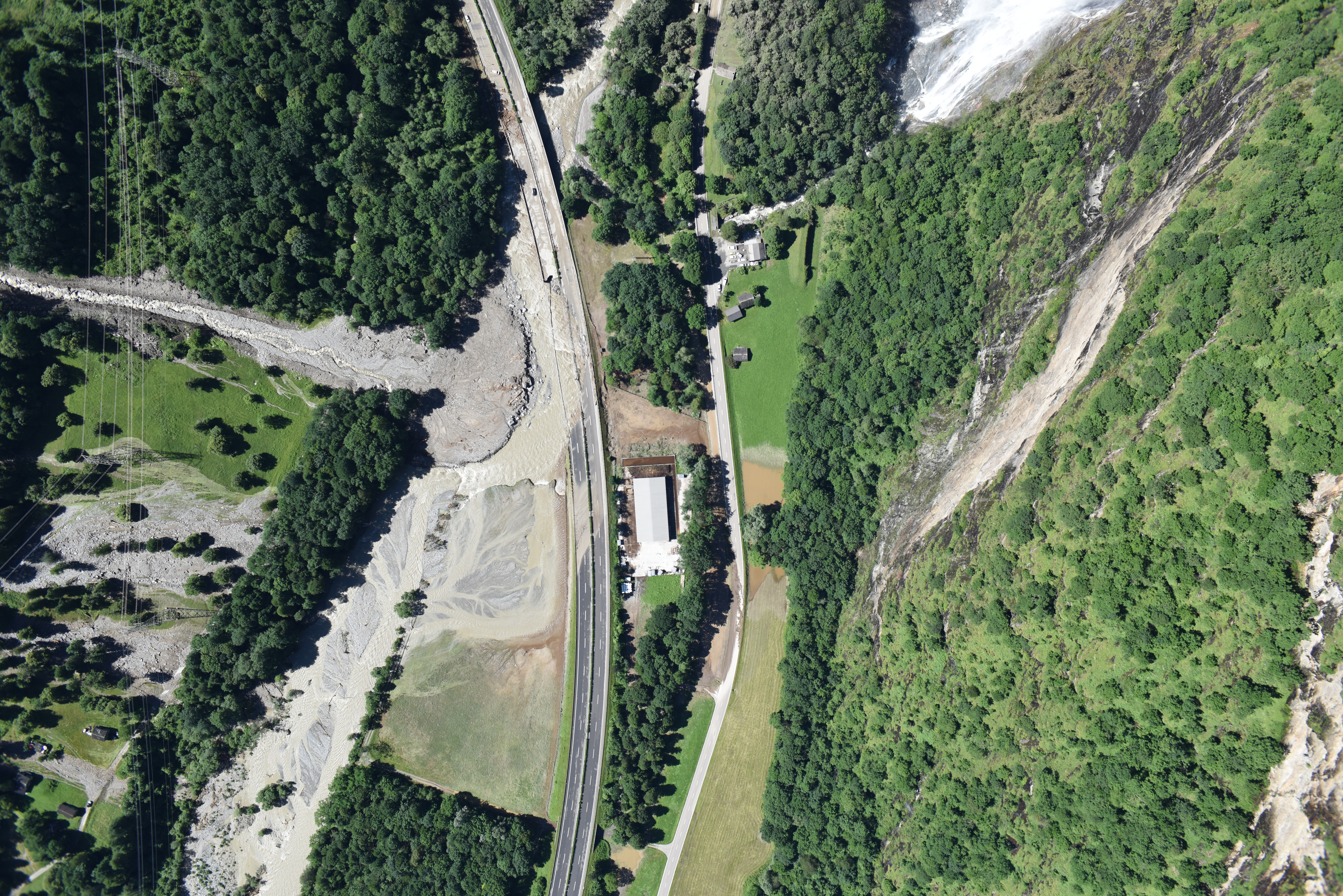
The mudslide blocked Moesa and damaged the A13 motorway in the Buffalora area on 22 June 2024

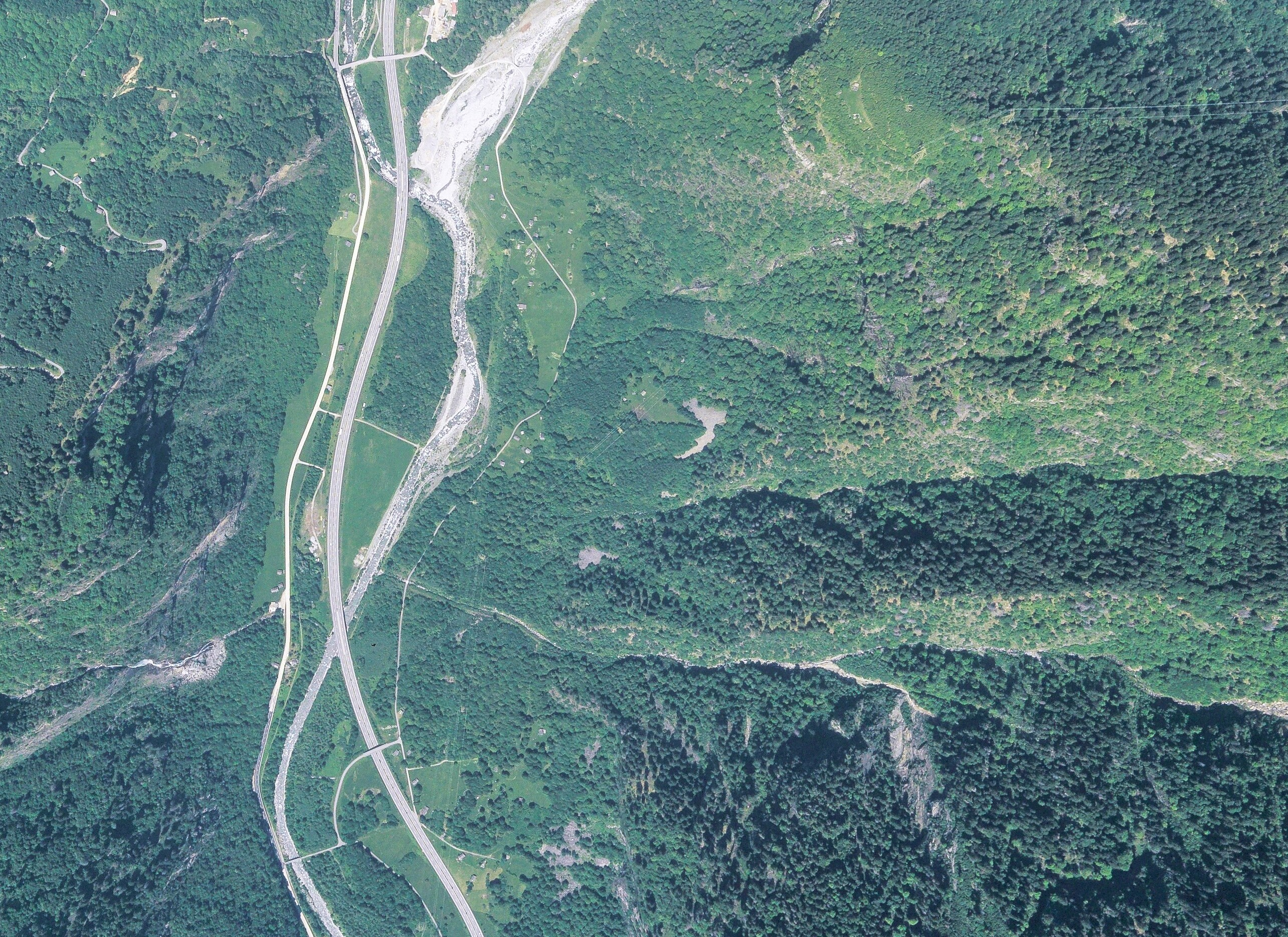
The Buffalora area in pre-storm conditions

As a result of a particularly strong flood from the Val d'Orbel, the Moesa was dammed above the Buffalora bridge on the A13 motorway, flooding the motorway and eroding its ramp over a distance of around 150 metres. In this section in the municipality of Soazza, the river valley is designated as the "Pomareda" nature reserve in the Federal Inventory of Floodplain Areas of National Importance. The Val d'Orbel stream on the east side of the valley carried debris with a volume of around 50,000 m^{3} (1,800,000 cu ft) due to the rainfall. In 2019, a mudslide from the same stream channel had already caused flooding of the floodplain area next to the motorway at this point during a flood on the Moesa.

The Hauptstrasse 13 and some municipal roads in the Mesolcina were impassable due to mudslides. For safety reasons and because of the clean-up work, the main road between Mesocco and Lostallo was closed in the following days.

Federal Councillor Ignazio Cassis visited the damaged areas in the valley together with the Grisons government councillor Jon Domenic Parolini, the Ticino State Council President Christian Vitta and other members of the authorities. The cantonal authorities planned to repair the damage to the infrastructure in the Sorte-Lostallo-Cabbiolo area as a first priority in order to make local traffic in the valley possible again, while the roads in the area above from Soazza to Mesocco were given second priority. The Swiss Army set up an air bridge with helicopters between Mesocco and Roveredo for emergencies.

Because of the destruction of the road, the authorities closed the A13 near Thusis in the north and Lostallo in the south. The north–south route through the San Bernardino tunnel, which often carries around 15,000 vehicles a day in the summer months, was unusable for around two weeks. Because the expected increase in traffic through the Gotthard would hardly be able to be managed with the Gotthard Road Tunnel, the Federal Council planned to reach an international traffic agreement with neighboring countries in order to distribute the travel through the Alps to the other Alpine passes during the summer.

On 24 June, excavation work began to clear the blocked riverbed of the Moesa near Buffalora in order to then repair the damaged motorway embankment. Large boulders were blasted away. A single-lane reopening of the road was expected by 5 July, after initially aiming for 10 July. On 26 June, the Ticino cantonal government decided to transfer 80,000 francs in emergency aid to the Mesolcina region in the neighbouring canton of Grisons.

== 25 and 26 June ==
On 25 June 2024, another thunderstorm zone with heavy rain moved from the southwest over parts of Switzerland. Shortly after 10 p.m., the air traffic control company Skyguide temporarily closed Geneva airspace due to flooding in the basement of the control center, as the cooling of the data center had been impaired. As a result, take-offs and landings could no longer take place at Geneva Airport. Flooding occurred in Liestal and Morges, among other places. According to information from Alertswiss, there was a partial power outage in the Stein am Rhein/Ramsen area.

== 29 and 30 June ==
In advance, warnings had already been issued of renewed storms with heavy rainfall and a foehn storm in the Alps for 29 and 30 June 2024. As a result, the cantonal authorities of Geneva and Vaud banned all outdoor events as a precautionary measure on 29 June. The canton of Valais, in turn, warned of flooding and mudslides. In large parts of Switzerland, danger level 3 or 4 (significant or great danger possible) was in effect on the afternoon of 29 June. In Valais the river Rhône flooded industrial sites at Sierre. Saas-Grund claimed one person killed after a mudslide in the town center. In Binntal it rained 158mm in one hour. A man who had to check the power station at the river disappeared. Many roads across alpine passes as well as the main railway line were blocked. Water treatment plants were severely damaged, the huge plant in Sierre only started working partially in February 2025 and was planned to be fully operational in 2026.

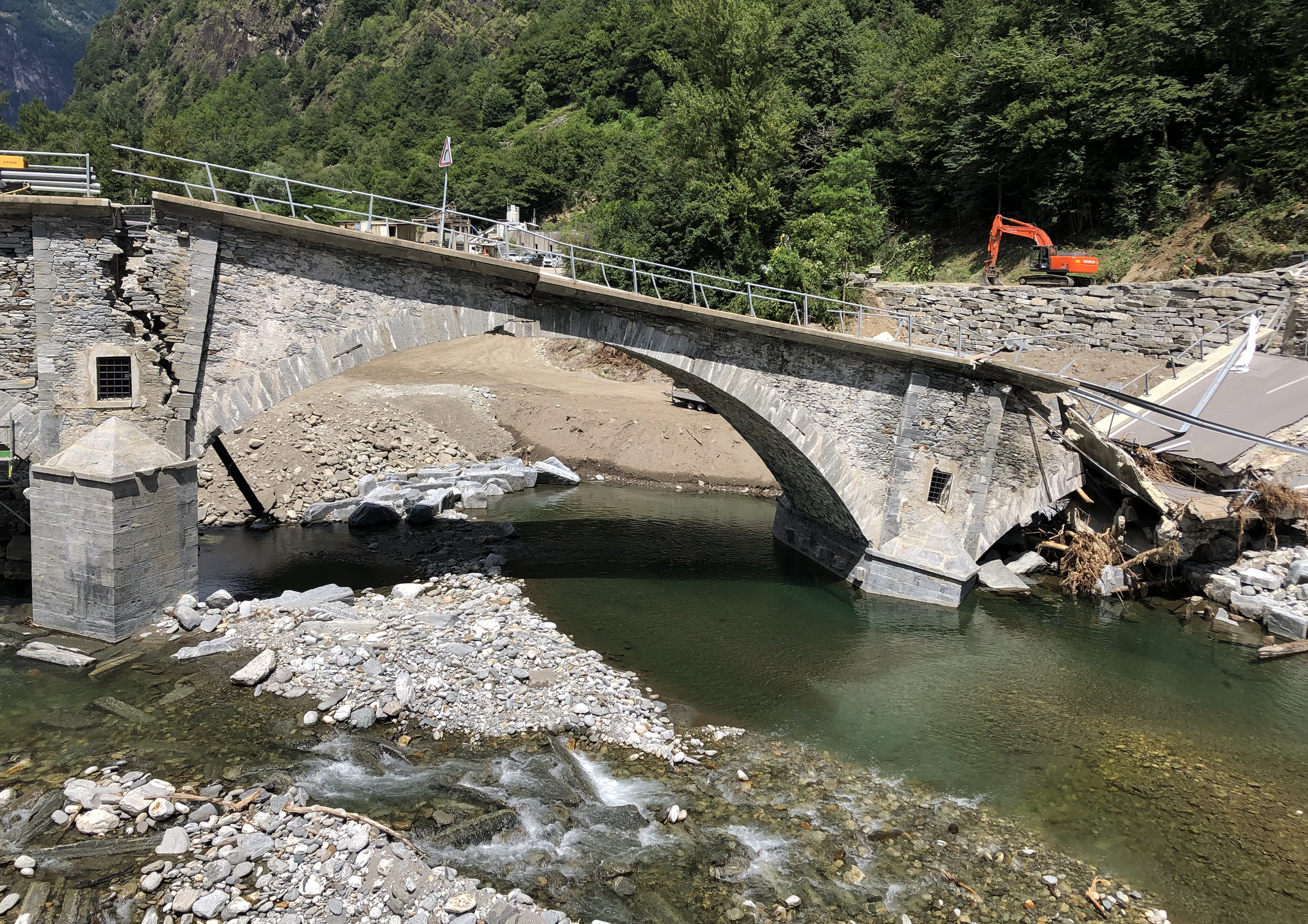
The partially destroyed Visletto bridge across the Maggia river near Cevio

Persistent rain in the southern slope of the alps caused flooding and mud avalanches in the upper Valleys of the Valle Maggia, especially in Val Bavona and Val Lavizzara. 100 buildings were destroyed as well as the bridge main road near Cevio, providing the only access to the valleys. Seven people were killed in the events. Val Bavona was locked off for tourism for nine months until 2025.

== See also ==
- 2024 European floods
- 2024 France floods
- 2024 Germany floods
- 2024 United Kingdom floods
- List of floods in Europe
