= 2008 Papua New Guinea floods =

Natural disaster in Papua New Guinea

Coordinates: 9.5°S 147.116°E

The 2008 Papua New Guinea floods displaced roughly 75,000 people located in Papua New Guinea, prompting an international response to provide support for the region. The country was struck by large sea swells on 16 December, apparently caused by "strong storms", which affected over eight provinces and caused at least one death.

== Response ==
The United Nations dispatched a six-member disaster assessment team after determining that there was a high possibility of water-borne diseases spreading throughout the populace. According to early government estimates, 60,000 people had been displaced, while 35,000 were in need of "immediate aid", according to the United Nations. The tides destroyed crops and carried away farming implements. U.N. spokeswoman Elisabeth Byrs stated that displacement rates were high, with as many as "half the population of Manus Island" being displaced. Byrs also said that, "The Government of Papua New Guinea has declared a state of national disaster", adding that "a team of [UN] experts should arrive on Wednesday to examine [Papua New Guinean] needs." Byrs concluded by stating that, "The affected islands are scattered and the never-ending nature of the tidal waves makes the evaluation of the situation very difficult."

Australia pledged A$1 million in support, and had already started flying food and supplies to affected areas; the relief flights were troubled, with multiple planes sustaining damage from birds. A C-130 Hercules taking off from the PNG province of New Ireland on 16 December aborted after a bird hit one of the plane's propellers. The second attempt, four hours after the first, met the same fate, with another bird hitting the aircraft while it was taxiing, causing serious engine damage to the left-hand propeller and forcing the RAAF crew to be grounded for a week while waiting for a replacement engine.

New Zealand also pledged $300,000 in support for the Red Cross relief effort in PNG. A New Zealand councilman, Shane Bayley, flew out with the United Nations disaster assessment team, later reporting that "a lot of the food gardens in the coast villages having been destroyed; that is their local supply of food, so it's also ensuring they have a means of distribution for food supplies."

== See also ==
- 2024 Papua New Guinea floods
