= 2024 Kenya–Tanzania floods =

Natural disaster in the Kenya-Tanzania region

- Date: April – May 2024
- Location: Kenya, Tanzania
- Type: Floods
- Deaths: 522+
- Injuries: 438+
- Missing: 159+
- Displaced: 503,661

From 18 April to early May 2024, floods hit Kenya, affecting people in 33 of the 47 counties, while also causing devastation in northern Tanzania.

One of the main drivers of heavy rain in East Africa is the Indian Ocean Dipole (IOD). During a positive phase, the waters in the western Indian Ocean are much warmer than normal, which can bring heavier rain regardless of El Niño. However, when both a positive IOD and an El Niño occur at the same time, rains in East Africa can become extreme.

== Impact ==
Affected areas by the April 2024 flooding events in Eastern Africa, EU Emergency Response Coordination Centre (ERCC)

=== Kenya ===
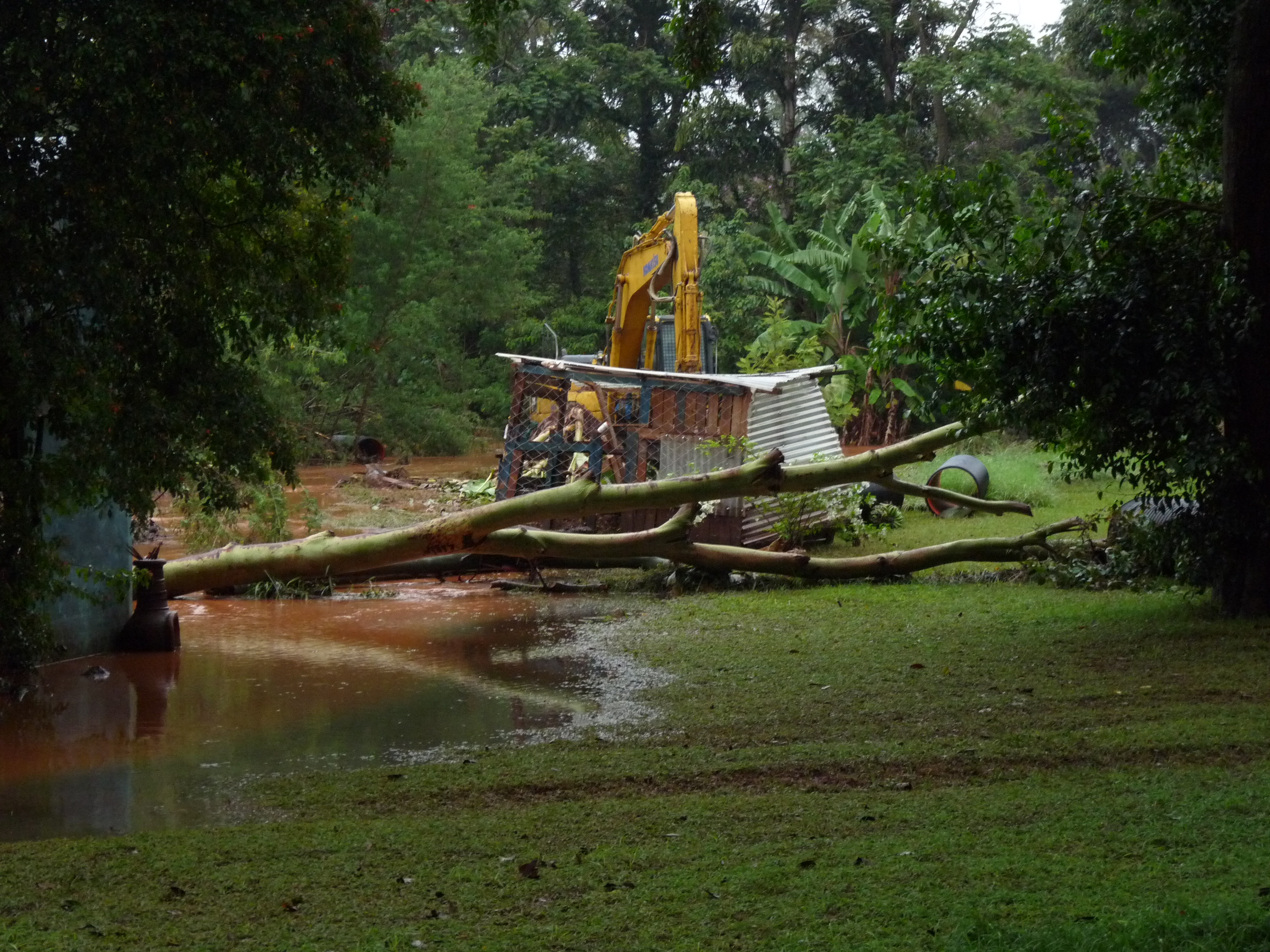
A fallen tree after the flood in Kenya

The capital Nairobi and surrounding areas were particularly affected. The Nairobi River and the Athi River both burst their banks displacing 40,000 people. At least 300 deaths, 188 injuries, 75 missing and 300,000 displaced people were reported. The UN Office for the Coordination of Humanitarian Aid also reported at least 960 livestock and 24 thousand acres of farmland were flooded.

In the morning hours of 29 April, a railway embankment failed near Mai Mahiu, with the resulting flood killing an additional 61 people with another 84 missing.

Schools in Kenya were also barred from re-opening for the second term until further notice.

=== Tanzania ===
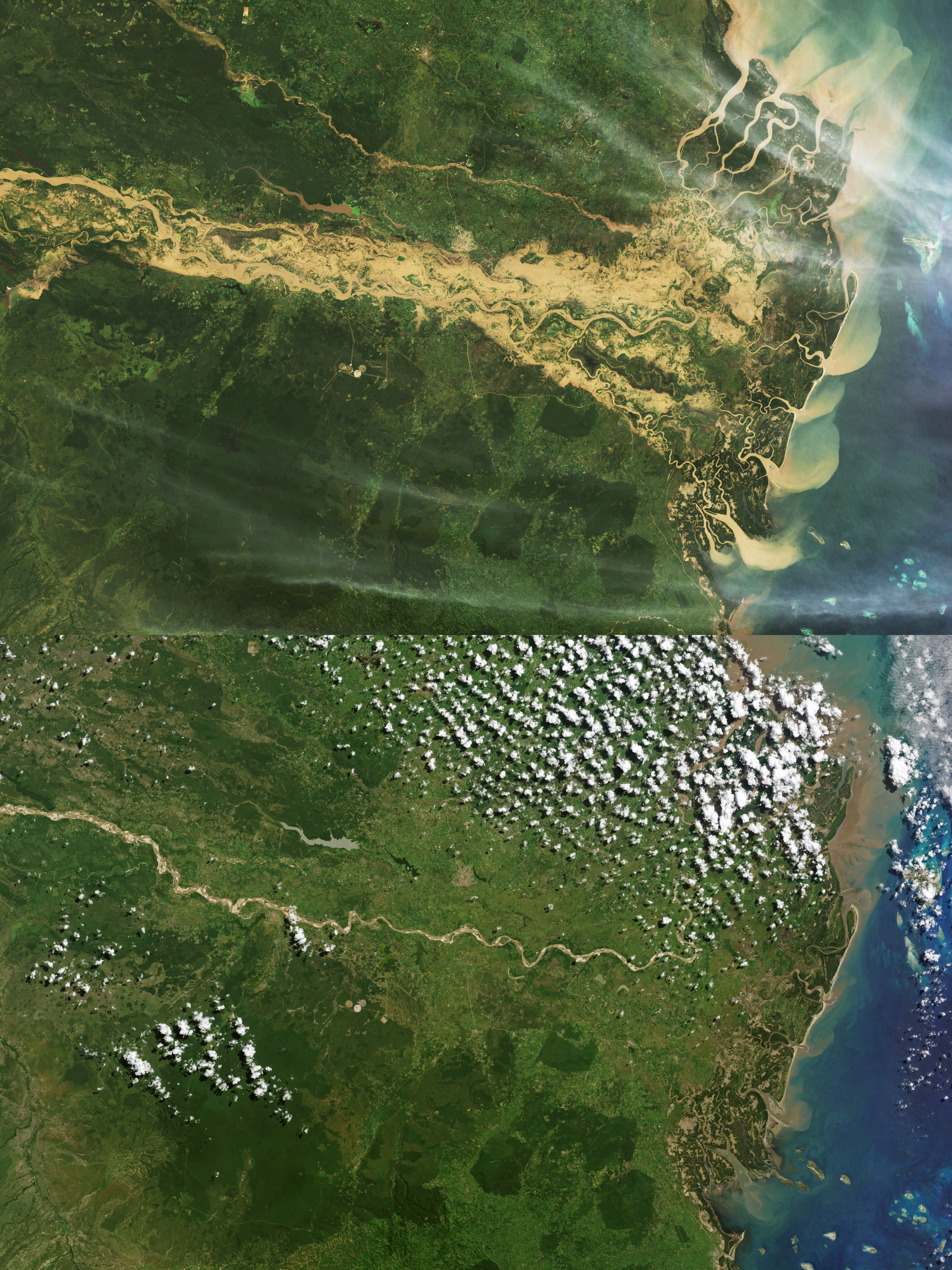
Rufiji River and Satellite imagery of flooding along its deltaic shores 29 April 2024（top） 5 May 2023（bottom）

Floods in northern Tanzania killed 161 people, injured 250 others, damaged over 10,000 houses and affected 210,000 people in 51,000 households.

== Aftermath ==
=== Kenya ===
Residents were asked to move to higher ground for their own safety. People living in dangerous areas around the country will be moved to land provided by the National Youth Service. Military and the national government were mobilized to work with counties to support those in distress. Kiambu county announced measures to mitigate the situation, including building inspections.

In early May, the Kenyan government ordered people living near 178 dams and reservoirs to evacuate. The ministry established temporary shelters, food and essentials for evacuees. President William Ruto declared a public holiday on 10 May to mourn the victims of the floods.
