= 2024 Southeast Asia heat wave =

Natural disaster

Since April 2024, several Southeast Asian countries have experienced record-breaking temperatures which have left several people dead. Heat indices peaked at 53 °C (127 °F) in Iba in the Philippines on 28 April 2024. The heat wave has been attributed to a combination of causes, including climate change and El Niño.

In some countries, the high heat has caused excessive energy demand. Drought conditions have worsened across the region. In Indonesia, dengue infections increased. In Myanmar, the heat wave exacerbated the humanitarian crisis caused by the ongoing civil war. Many government agencies have declared local emergencies and advised safety measures to protect residents from the heat, and some countries have closed schools or shortened their hours.

== By country ==
=== Brunei ===
The areas of Anggerek Desa, Bangar, Labi, Lumapas, Batang Duri, Lekiun, and the capital of Bandar Seri Begawan have been experiencing excessive hot weather and reduced precipitation since 21 March, with maximum temperatures reaching at least 35 °C (95 °F). The heat has led many Bruneians to stay indoors and limit outdoor activities, increasing their usage of air-conditioning.

=== Cambodia ===
Cambodia recorded temperatures ranging from 39 °C (102 °F) to 41 °C (106 °F), which are expected to rise further, especially around the capital Phnom Penh. Temperatures are the hottest recorded in about 170 years, and public school days have been reduced by two hours to prevent heat-related illnesses. In late April, the hot weather caused by the heat wave contributed to an ammo explosion that destroyed a military warehouse, barracks, and an office building, damaged trucks and 25 homes, and killed 20 Cambodian soldiers in Kampong Speu.

=== East Timor ===
Timor-Leste has been experiencing drought since February in 10 of 14 municipalities, namely Aileu, Ainaro, Atauro, Baucau, Bobonaro, Cova Lima, Dili, Manatuto, Oecusse, and Viqueque. The heat wave has led to further water scarcity problems in many parts of the country, with low, unevenly distributed rainfall throughout the heat wave period.

=== Indonesia ===
Beginning in March, warmer weather has contributed to an increase of dengue fever infections in Indonesia. By the week of 8 April, there were 62,001 infections and 475 deaths from dengue, compared to 22,551 infections and 170 deaths in the same period of 2023. This triggered the Ministry of Health to issue a warning to tourists visiting Bali, recommending vaccination. Indonesia's Meteorology, Climatology, and Geophysical Agency (BMKG) has categorized the hot weather as a "seasonal transition" rather than a "heat wave," since 76% of the country was still experiencing rain when the highest temperature was recorded in Palu, Central Sulawesi at 37.8 °C (100.0 °F).

=== Laos ===
On 16 April 2024, Laos saw an all-time high temperature when 42.7 °C (108.9 °F) was recorded in Luang Prabang. The weather bureau warned against outdoor activities, and most areas in the country were forecasted to reach 40 °C (104 °F) to 43 °C (109 °F) from 25 to 28 April.

=== Malaysia ===
As of 4 April, level 2 heat waves had been declared in Kelantan and Pahang, while level 1 heat waves were declared in Johor, Kedah, Negeri Sembilan, Perak, Perlis, Sabah, Sarawak, and Terengganu. As of 14 April, 45 heat-related illness cases have been reported nationwide: 33 cases of heat exhaustion, 11 cases of heatstroke, and one case of heat cramp. At least two heat-related deaths were recorded in Pahang and Kelantan.

Drought conditions affected over 75,000 families in the country, including 58,080 families in Sabah. Papar District was declared a drought disaster area in early March. The drought was exacerbated by the heat wave, resulting a severe water crisis for the district. Local government and various agencies deployed assets and logistics to supply water to affected families. The National Disaster Management Agency (NADMA) and the Royal Malaysian Air Force (RMAF) worked with local agencies to carry out three days of cloud seeding in water catchment areas of Papar, Lahad Datu, and Tawau to increase river water levels and meet domestic needs around Sabah.

=== Myanmar ===
Temperatures in Myanmar hit 47 °C (117 °F) in Chauk Township in Mandalay Region, 45 °C (113 °F) in Nyaung-U, and 44 °C (111 °F) in Myingyan, Minbu and Sinphyukyun in Magway Region. Since the start of April 2024, a Yangon charity has treated at least 100 people for heat-related injuries. According to Radio Free Asia, at least 1,473 people died from heat-related causes in April alone.

Civilians displaced by the ongoing civil war in Sagaing Region have been doubly impacted. Mone Hla villagers in Khin-U Township have reported health problems and water shortages since their homes were torched by junta soldiers on 28 March. The rolling power blackout left civilians unable to use electric appliances to cool themselves, and many were left to rest in the shade of park trees in the afternoon.

=== Philippines ===
The heat index in several areas of the Philippines rose to levels of 42 °C (108 °F) to 51 °C (124 °F). On 28 April, a heat index of 53 °C (127 °F) was recorded in Iba, Zambales, the highest in the country so far in 2024. As of 18 April, authorities had logged 34 heat-related illnesses. Due to El Niño season in the Philippines, forecasters predicted that dangerous heat indices in at least 32 areas would continue until mid-May.

The National Grid Corporation of the Philippines advised the risk of several localised brownouts, and five power grids in Luzon and Visayas experienced outages as they failed to meet demand. The Department of Labor and Employment recommended that employers allow their workers to work from home. In-person attendance at public schools was suspended on 29 and 30 April, favouring long-distance learning over the often crowded and poorly ventilated classrooms in public schools. Resorts became fully booked and several shopping malls saw large crowds of people seeking to cool themselves inside.

On 7 May, the PAGASA declared that the worst of the record-high temperatures was over, expecting thunderstorms to hit the country by the second half of May and for La Niña to prevail by June, allowing Angat Dam, which supplies water to Metro Manila and nearby provinces, to recover slowly.

=== Singapore ===
The highest temperature recorded in Choa Chu Kang was 36.3 °C (97.3 °F). The Meteorological Service Singapore stated that 2024 could be warmer than 2023, making it the fourth-warmest year since recordkeeping began in 1929. Students have been advised by their schools to wear cooler or looser gym gear to prevent heat stroke.

=== Thailand ===
As of 28 April, there have been 30 heat-related deaths in Thailand, almost matching the 37 deaths in the whole of 2023. The temperature has caused record electricity demand as people seek to cool themselves. Water levels at Lam Takhong Dam and Lam Mun river in Nakhon Ratchasima dropped sharply as drought and extreme heat caused the main water sources to run dry, sparking fears of water shortage. Inspections at chemical warehouses were stopped after a series of fires due to fears that the stored chemicals may be heat sensitive.

In late April, residents from the Nakhon Sawan providence held a rain ritual (traditionally done with a live cat) using a Doraemon plushie in a cage. The ritual was posted on X (formerly Twitter), where it went viral, gaining 16 million views and 219,000 likes.

The highest temperature recorded by the Thai Meteorological Department during April was 44.2 °C (111.6 °F) in Lampang province.

=== Vietnam ===
The northwestern region of Điện Biên and Sơn La, in areas from Nghệ An to Quảng Ngãi, experienced high temperatures from 39 °C (102 °F) to 40 °C (104 °F). Most of southern Vietnam, including Ho Chi Minh City, endured the longest heat wave in 30 years. Farmers in the Mekong Delta faced decreased crop yields. In the province of Đồng Nai, mass fish deaths blanketed the entire view of a 300-hectare reservoir due to dwindling water levels caused by the heat wave. Several provinces have been declared in a state of emergency due to the water crisis, land subsidence, and erosion.

== See also ==
- 2023–2024 El Niño event
