= 2024 West African floods =

Excess rain-caused Disaster in Niger and Ghana

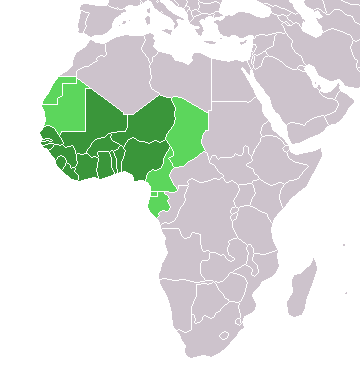
- Nations of West and Central Africa
- Location: Niger, Ghana, Nigeria, Chad, Mali, Cameroon, Guinea
- Deaths: 1,500+
- Injuries: 26+
- Property damage: >US$ 2 million, 4,000 cattle dead, 200+ houses damaged or destroyed
- Displaced: 1,000,000+

In 2024, heavy rainfall impacted several countries across West and Central Africa, including Nigeria, Chad, Niger, Mali, Guinea, Cameroon and Ghana. At least 1,500 were killed and more than a million were displaced. The rainy season in West Africa lasts from June to September, with June alone producing prolonged deadly and damaging floods.

== Niger ==
Up to 21 June 2024, 21 citizens in Niger died as a result of heavy rains causing extensive flooding primarily in the Maradi region and Niamey suburbs. Over 6,000 others were affected by the flooding. Niger's director-general of civil protection Colonel Boubacar Bak reported on national television that 13 of the deceased were victims of their houses collapsing, while eight more were victims of drowning. The Maradi region in central Niger accounted for 14 of the 21 deaths. 26 people were injured and roughly 4,000 cattle were killed or lost.

== Ghana ==
In early June 2024, over 2,000 people living in the Central region of Ghana were displaced by increased water levels of the Ayensu River due to heavy rains and diversion of the river to work on an expansion to the Kasoa-Winneba highway. Over 200 homes were submerged and three collapsed, and several acres of farmland were destroyed.

In addition, the heavy rainfall caused West Africa's largest vegetable garden at Maphlix Trust Farms in Tadzewu, Ketu North Municipality, Volta Region, to flood, destroying over US$ 2 million in vegetable produce and architectural infrastructure, including 27 specialized greenhouses, fertigation tanks, and administrative buildings. "30 acres of okra, 15 acres of chili, 10 acres of sweet potato, and 55 acres of installed irrigation" were submerged or swept away by the floodwaters. In addition, "800 bags of fertilizers and farming items" were lost.

== Nigeria ==
Heavy flooding in Nigeria's Borno state led to a prison wall collapse, allowing 274 inmates to escape from the Maiduguri Medium Security Custodial Centre. The prison break occurred while inmates were being transferred to a safer location, with seven inmates recaptured shortly after.

The floods in northeast Nigeria left over 100,000 homes destroyed or damaged, at least 20 confirmed deaths. The floods, caused by heavy rainfall and overflowing rivers, affected Borno, Yobe, Adamawa and Taraba states. The Nigerian government declared a state of emergency in the affected areas, with international organisations and local NGOs providing assistance.
