= 2024 Japan heatwaves =

Natural disasters

Meteorological history
- Duration: April - October 2024
- Heat wave caused by stationary high-pressure area
- Max temp: 41 °C (106 °F), recorded at Sano, Tochigi Prefecture on 29 July

Overall effects
- Fatalities: 123+ 2,033 (official estimated by Ministry of Health, Labour and Welfare)
- Areas affected: Shizuoka Prefecture, Osaka Prefecture, Nara Prefecture, Tochigi Prefecture, Fukuoka Prefecture, Hokkaido Prefecture

In 2024, Japan experienced excessive heat beginning in April, which led to at least 59 heat-related deaths and at least 62 temperature observation posts across Japan breaking temperature records in July. According to the Japan Meteorological Agency (JMA), the average temperatures reached during the heat waves represented the hottest for Japan in April and July since its record-keeping began in 1898.

== Meteorology ==
According to the JMA, the heatwave in July was caused by a high-pressure area stationing over the Pacific Ocean coupled with the movement of warm air from Southern Japan into its northern regions. On 2 August, The high-pressure system moved over a region ranging from Okinawa to Tohoku.

== Heatwave ==
According to the JMA, April 2024's average temperature throughout Japan was 2.76°C higher than the average annual April temperature, making it the hottest April since JMA records began in 1898.

In June 2024, Shizuoka Prefecture became the first Japanese prefecture to reach and surpass 40 °C (104 °F) in 2024.

In July 2024, temperatures in Japan reached 2.16°C higher than its July averages, breaking the record set in July 2023 at 1.91°C higher. On 29 July, temperatures reached 41 °C (106 °F) at Sano in Tochigi Prefecture, and met or exceeded 40 °C (104 °F) in six other locations that included Hamamatsu in Shizuoka Prefecture.

On 2 August, Totsukawa, Nara Prefecture reached 39.9 °C (103.8 °F); Dazaifu, Fukuoka Prefecture reached 39.3 °C (102.7 °F); and Hirakata, Osaka Prefecture reached 39.1 °C (102.4 °F). In Western Japan, six weather observation points recorded all-time high temperatures.

Japan's Fire and Disaster Management Agency reported that between 1-21 July, 24,300 people throughout Japan were hospitalized due to heatstroke, with 9,078 of whom were hospitalized from 15 to 21 July alone. Of these, Japan's Ministry of Health, Labour and Welfare found that construction workers accounted for the greatest portion of recorded deaths due to their exposure to outdoor heat while performing extensive manual labor.

Hakodate City recorded the most days with >30 °C (86 °F) temperatures since recording started in 1872. Excessive heat caused widespread impacts to agriculture, including "dozens of tons" of pumpkins that need to be disposed of as a result of discoloration caused by intense, prolonged sunlight. 10 million in JPY was lost due to farmers discarding roughly 60,000 corn plants to keep prices stable following excess yield. Many farms had 700–800 kg (1,500–1,800 lb) of tomatoes per day fall below market standards due to the heat, causing many farmers to abandon tomato farming.

== An average temperature in August ==
City	Average temperature in August 2024	Average temperature in August past 100 years
Hiroshima	30.7 °C (87.3 °F)	28.5 °C (83.3 °F)
Takamatsu, Shikoku Island	30.6 °C (87.1 °F)	28.6 °C (83.5 °F)
Kumamoto, Kyushu Island	30.6 °C (87.1 °F)	28.4 °C (83.1 °F)
Fukuoka, Kyushu Island	30.5 °C (86.9 °F)	28.4 °C (83.1 °F)
Osaka	30.4 °C (86.7 °F)	29.0 °C (84.2 °F)
Nagoya	30.2 °C (86.4 °F)	28.2 °C (82.8 °F)
Kyoto	30.1 °C (86.2 °F)	28.5 °C (83.3 °F)
Yonago	29.3 °C (84.7 °F)	27.3 °C (81.1 °F)
Tokyo	29.0 °C (84.2 °F)	26.9 °C (80.4 °F)
Kanazawa	29.0 °C (84.2 °F)	27.3 °C (81.1 °F)
Sendai	27.4 °C (81.3 °F)	24.4 °C (75.9 °F)
Aomori	25.8 °C (78.4 °F)	23.5 °C (74.3 °F)
Sapporo, Hokkaido	27.4 °C (81.3 °F)	24.4 °C (75.9 °F)
Kushiro, Hokkaido	21.2 °C (70.2 °F)	18.2 °C (64.8 °F)

== A high temperature above 35 °C (95 °F) days ==
City	A high temperature above 35 °C (95 °F) days	A highest temperature day
Dazaifu, Kyushu Island	59	2 August 39.2 °C (102.6 °F)
Hita, Kyushu Island	55	3 and 5 August 39.3 °C (102.7 °F)
Kurume, Kyushu Island	53	3 August 38.9 °C (102.0 °F)
Kumamoto Kyushu Island	51	4 August 38.8 °C (101.8 °F)
Kyoto	50	29 July 39.4 °C (102.9 °F)
Kiryu, Gunma Prefecture	50	12 August 39.7 °C (103.5 °F)
Nagoya	48	5 August 39.0 °C (102.2 °F)
Kumagaya, Saitama Prefecture	48	28 July 40.0 °C (104.0 °F)
Takamatsu, Shikoku Island	48	3 August 37.5 °C (99.5 °F)
Mino, Gifu Prefecture	44	16 August 40.0 °C (104.0 °F)
Nishiwaki, Hyogo Prefecture	43	13 and 14 August 39.5 °C (103.1 °F)
Kofu, Yamanashi Prefecture	42	22 July 39.4 °C (102.9 °F)
Hiroshima	42	16 August 38.7 °C (101.7 °F)
Sano, Tochigi Prefecture	39	29 July 41.0 °C (105.8 °F)
Hachioji	29	29 July 38.7 °C (101.7 °F)

== A low temperature above 25 °C (77 °F) days ==
City	A low temperature above 25 °C (77 °F) days	The most maximum low temperature above 25 °C (77 °F) days	A latest temperature above 25 °C (77 °F) days
Hiroshima	67	23 August 29.2 °C (84.6 °F)	21 September
Shimonoseki	66	9 July 29.1 °C (84.4 °F)	21 September
Takamatsu, Shikoku Island	66	4 August 29.0 °C (84.2 °F)	21 September
Kumamoto Kyushu Island	65	4 August 29.49 °C (85.08 °F)	21 September
Kyoto	64	20 July and 21 September 28.5 °C (83.3 °F)	21 September
Yokohama	63	29 June 29.2 °C (84.6 °F)	21 September
Sakai, Osaka Prefecture	58	5 August 28.8 °C (83.8 °F)	21 September
Nagoya	56	13 August 28.5 °C (83.3 °F)	21 September
Kurume, Kyushu Island	53	4 August 29.0 °C (84.2 °F)	21 September
Dazaifu, Kyushu Island	51	19 July 28.1 °C (82.6 °F)	20 September
Kumagaya, Saitama Prefecture	49	29 July 28.9 °C (84.0 °F)	15 September
Himeji, Hyogo Prefecture	48	4 Augusty 28.1 °C (82.6 °F)	21 September

== Impact ==
From April 2024 to the end of July, at least 59 people were killed by heat-related illnesses.

In July 2024, in anticipation of continued excessive heat and predictions of greatly increased air conditioner use, Japan's government reinstated its gas and electricity subsidies beginning in August. The subsidies were planned to be reinstated for three months, although Japan's Policy Research Council urged the government to have it last until the end of 2024.

Several schools in Japan have begun implementing daily health assessment forms for students to record their body temperature, diet, water intake, and hours of sleep to monitor for heat stroke susceptibility. Many schools also had students wear watches that could alert them if their core temperature exceeded 38 °C (100 °F), provided them with cooling packs before exercise, and provided them rest in air-conditioned rooms for fifteen minutes following exercise periods of thirty minutes.

On 2 August, the JMA and the Japanese Environment Ministry issued heatstroke warnings to 36 of Japan's 47 prefectures.

On 6 August, Japanese authorities reported that in July, at least 123 people in the Greater Tokyo Area died as a result of heat-related illnesses. According to the Tokyo Medical Examiner's Office, most of the deceased were older than 60 years old. Only two had died while outdoors, and most had not been using air conditioning even though they had it installed. The Fire and Disaster Management Agency reported that over 37,000 people required hospitalization for treatment of heat stroke in July.

According to Japan Ministry of Health, Labour and Welfare official estimated report on May 3, 2025, 2,033 persons were human fatalities, caused by heatstroke from extreme heatwave on June to September 2024.

== See also ==
- 2023 Asia heat wave
- 2022 Japan heatwave
- 2018 Northeast Asia heat wave
