= Element Fire =

2024 wildfire in Arizona, USA

- Part of the 2024 Arizona wildfires
- The wildfire at night
- Date: August 6, 2024 –; August 19, 2024

Statistics
- Perimeter: 100% contained
- Burned area: 5,364 acres (2,171 ha; 8 sq mi; 22 km^{2})

Impacts
- Deaths: 0
- Injuries: 2
- Structures destroyed: 0

Ignition
- Cause: Lightning

The 2024 Element Fire was a wildfire that burned 5,364 acres across Mohave County in the U.S. state of Arizona from August 6 to August 19. It was the 8th-largest wildfire of the 2024 Arizona wildfire season, and injured 2 people.

== Progression ==
The fire started on August 6 near Kingman, and by August 8 had grown to 3,986 acres (1,613 ha). 145 personnel were assigned to the fire, and it had reached 5% containment the same day. By August 9, the fire had again grown to 5,364 acres (2,171 ha), its maximum coverage, and the fire began to burn into the Mount Tipton area. 2 people were injured due to heat from the fire on August 11, and the number of crews assigned to the fire grew to 206.

By August 12, containment on the fire had reached 16%, and by the morning of August 13 the fire had been declared 31% contained. Demobilization began on August 13, and the number of personnel assigned to the fire dropped to 100. On August 14, containment had again been bumped up to 40%, and it was determined that all road closures would be lifted the following day. By August 16, the fire had been declared 60% contained, and on August 19 the fire was declared 100% contained.

== See also ==
- Line Fire
- 2024 United States wildfires
