= 2024 Sumatra flash floods =

Indonesian natural disaster

- Date: 7 March 2024 – 13 March 2024
- Location: Sumatra, Indonesia
- Cause: Torrential monsoon rains
- Deaths: 26
- Property damage: Rp170.4 billion ($10.53 million)

From 7 March 2024 to 13 March 2024, flash floods and landslides in Sumatra, Indonesia killed 26 people, and caused Rp170.4 billion ($10.53 million) in damages. The floods were caused by higher-than-normal rainfall.

== Damages and casualties ==
The floods killed 26 people across the island, and left 11 missing. The affected included 15,500 children and 40,000 families. Scores of bridges, roads, houses, and schools across Sumatra have been affected, hampering rescue operations. Power outages and blackouts were common, and landslides buried 14 houses. In one incident, a mudslide caused a river to break its banks and flood mountainside villages in Pesisir Selatan Regency. 37,000 structures were submerged in the floods. The floods also affected 26 bridges, 45 mosques and 25 schools; destroyed 13 roads, and two irrigation system units, which in turn submerged 113 hectares (279 acres) of rice fields and 300 sq metres (3,230 sq feet) of plantation and gardens. Floodwaters waterlogged streets in Padang City. Roads were left muddy, and either collapsed or were strewn with trees. Relief efforts were hampered by persistent rainfall and blocked roads. Mud, rocks, trees, and other debris rushed down mountainsides and engulfed villages in West Sumatra.

== Aftermath ==
Save the Children Indonesia, along with local help, distributed supplies in affected areas which included food, clean water, shelter kits, hygiene kits, clothes, bedding, and medicine. Abdul Malik, the West Sumatra provincial head of Indonesia's search and rescue agency, said on March 11 that "Five hundred packages of aid including tents, blankets, water purifiers, food and hygiene kits were being distributed".

== See also ==
- 2024 Sulawesi landslide
- May 2024 Sumatra flash floods and cold lava
- List of floods
- 2020 Jakarta floods
- 2024 Tana Toraja landslides
