= 2024 Hajj extreme heat disaster =

Extreme heat event in Mecca

- Map
- Date: 14–19 June 2024
- Location: Mecca, Saudi Arabia
- Cause: Extreme heat
- Participants: 1.8 million
- Outcome: Fatalities among pilgrims from multiple countries
- Deaths: At least 1,301
- Injuries: At least 2,764 (on 16 June alone)
- Hottest temperature reported in Mecca: 51.8 °C (125.2 °F)

Between 14 and 19 June 2024, at least 1,301 people on the Hajj pilgrimage died in Mecca, Saudi Arabia, due to extreme heat, with temperatures exceeding 50 °C (122 °F). Extreme heat caused heat stroke and dehydration among the pilgrims, leading to the deaths. The hottest recorded temperature reported in the Grand Mosque of Mecca was 51.8 °C (125.2 °F). At least 2,764 cases of heat-related illness, including heat stroke, were reported on 16 June alone.

== Background ==
Hajj is a annual pilgrimage to Mecca, Saudi Arabia, performed by between 2 and 3 million Muslims every year. The 2024 Hajj ran from the evening of 14 June through 19 June, with 1.8 million pilgrims attending.

== Casualties ==
The health minister of Saudi Arabia said that at least 1,301 people died during the pilgrimage. Of the dead, at least 600 were Egyptian pilgrims. Jordanian diplomats stated that 60 Jordanians had also died from extreme heat. Tunisia's foreign ministry reported that at least 35 Tunisian pilgrims died during "a sharp rise in temperatures". Indonesia reported 132 Indonesian deaths, at least three of which were confirmed to be due to heat stroke. Thirteen pilgrims from the Kurdistan Region in Iraq were reported dead of reported heat stroke. Five female pilgrims from India succumbed to heat stroke on Mount Arafat and in Muzdalifah. Pilgrims from Iran and Senegal were also among the dead. Saudi authorities said there were over 2,700 instances of heat exhaustion.

An Arab diplomat said most Egyptian pilgrims died from heat-triggered health problems such as high blood pressure. Two Arab diplomats said a large number of pilgrims performed the Hajj without registration because they could not afford the official procedures, and it could have exacerbated the number of Egyptian casualties and injuries in general caused by extreme heat. Reasons for this included them not being able to access air-conditioned facilities or official food or water stations, leading to prolonged periods of dehydration, exposure to, and susceptibility to the extreme heat. One said the massive influx of unregistered pilgrims had likely overwhelmed the facilities in place, causing disorder in how food, water, and medical services were distributed. One person was killed in a crowd crush, but it was unspecified if this was related to the heat.

A witness to the disaster saw pilgrims lying still along the roadside and said ambulances "didn't know which way to turn".

Deaths by country
Nationality	Deaths	Ref
Algeria	22	
Australia	1	
Bangladesh	35	
Egypt	672	
France	2	
Guinea	4	
India	98	
Indonesia (Note: Some Indonesian citizens were confirmed killed by heat. Hundreds more died of chronic conditions and heat was described as "a contributing factor".)	234	
Iran	22	
Iraq	19	
Jordan	99	
Libya	10	
Malaysia (Note: It is reported that the majority died of chronic conditions. It is not confirmed if heat had influenced their deaths.)	14	
Morocco	20	
Netherlands	1	
Nigeria	15 (Note: A total of 15 Nigerians died during the Hajj. One committed suicide, so is not included there. Only one was confirmed to be directly killed by heat. The cause of death of the others is unknown.)	
Pakistan	58	
Philippines	1	
Russia	7	
Senegal	3	
Somalia	6	
Syria	5	
Tajikistan	3	
Tunisia	62	
Turkey	23	
United States	11	

== Aftermath ==
Tunisian president Kais Saied fired Ibrahim Chaibi, the minister of religious affairs, after 49 citizens died during the Hajj, a number which later increased to 62.

Egyptian prime minister Mostafa Madbouly ordered the revocation of 16 travel agents' licenses and referred their managers to the public prosecutor's office for involvement in illegal facilitation of travel to Mecca.

On 11 July 2024, Indonesian Islamic scholar Yazid bin Abdul Qadir Jawas died at the age of 62 in his native country. It was reported that his health worsened after he attended the Hajj, presumably due to the heat.

Pakistani rescue worker Asif Bashir was hailed as a hero for his role in saving the lives of 16 Indian and British nationals during the Hajj. His story was extensively covered by regional media, earning him the title 'Angel of Mina'.

== See also ==
- Incidents during the Hajj
- Mecca crane collapse
- 2015 Mina crowd crush
- Asif Bashir
