= Mai Mahiu =

Maai Mahiu
- Location within Kenya
- Coordinates: 0.98078°S 36.58742°E,
- Country: Kenya
- County: Nakuru County
- Time zone: UTC+3 (EAT)

Maai Mahiu is a town in Kenya's Nakuru County. The name means "hot water" in native Kikuyu, but another derivative could be "me'imayu", meaning impassable in Maasai.

The town is a trucking hub and is often considered to be a safe heaven for sex trade. Some studies confirm that underage prostitution is witnessed in the town.

Maai Mahiu has a train station as well as an inland container depot on the Nairobi–Malaba Standard Gauge Railway, which was inaugurated in October 2019.

The Kenya government has established a 50-acre Special Economic Zone in Maai Mahiu, to facilitate investment in the region, in financial, hospitality, retail, and recreational facilities.

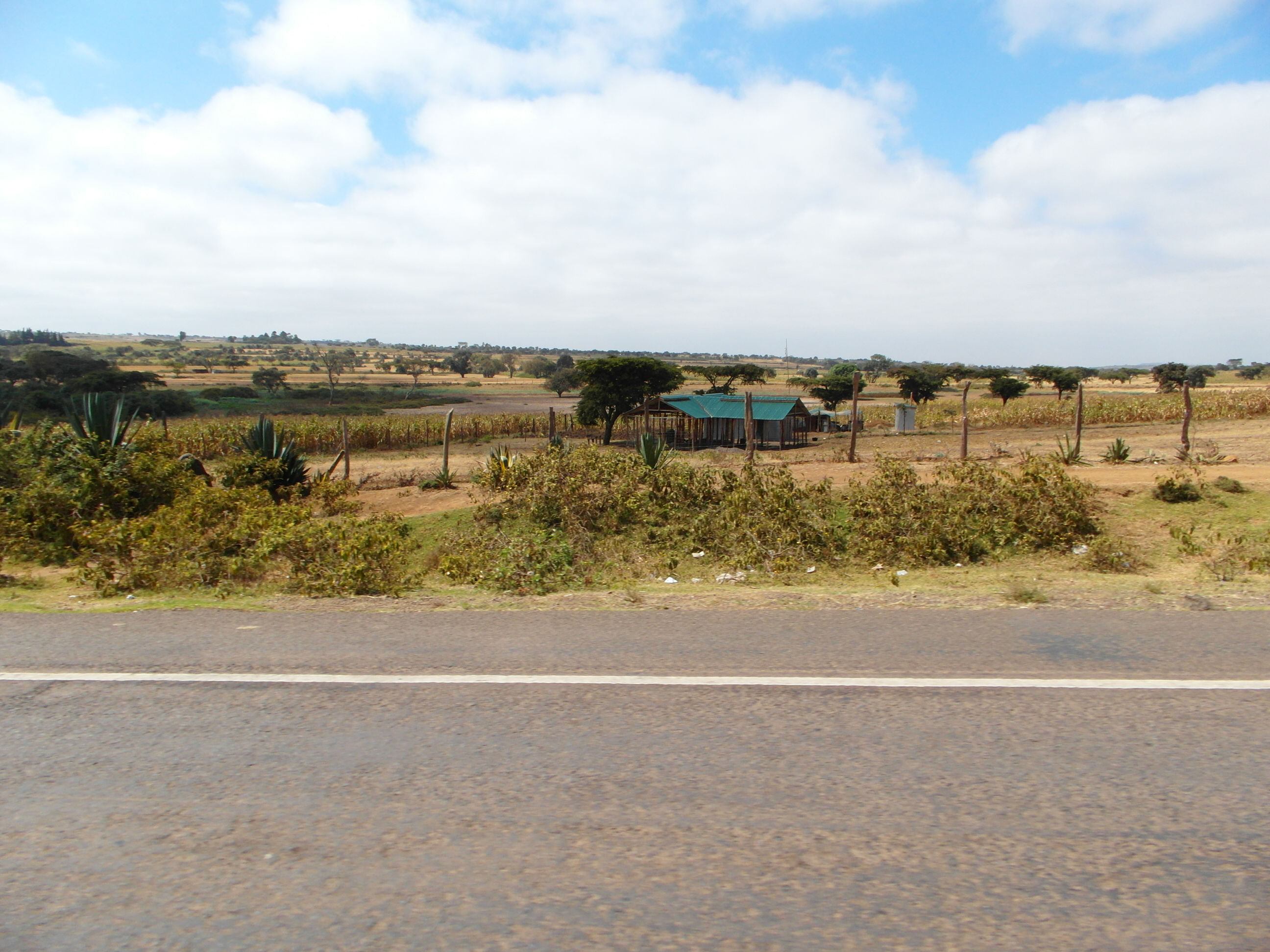
View of Mai Mahiu in 2013

In April 2024, a flash flood nearby killed at least 50 people in the village of Kamuchiri. The flood resulted from a blockage in a culvert beneath a railway embankment which led to a catastrophic failure and inundation; initially, it was reported as arising from a dam burst.
