= 2024 Papua New Guinea floods =

Natural disaster in Papua New Guinea

- Date: 18 March 2024 – 22 March 2024
- Location: Papua New Guinea
- Cause: Torrential rains, king tides
- Deaths: 23

From 18 March 2024 to 22 March 2024, floods and landslides in Papua New Guinea killed 23 people. The floods were caused by torrential rains and king tides.

== Damages and Casualties ==
The floods and landslides killed 23, including a mother and her child. The fatalities occurred during three separate landslides in Chimbu Province. Roads were washed away in coastal regions. The village of Lese Kavora was severely affected by king tides, damaging food gardens and contaminating water wells. Rivers overflowed around deltas. Enga Province also suffered heavy floods. Tons of mud buried homes in the same province. The entire country experienced rain and stormy weather.

== Aftermath ==
The floods ravaged the local economy, and many survived on only one meal per day. The government allocated 10,000 Papua New Guinean kinas ($2,645) for relief assistance. The country is one of the most at-risk to climate change, ranking 16 according to the 2022 World Risk Index.

== See also ==
- 2008 Papua New Guinea floods
