= Hauptstrasse 13 =

Road in Switzerland

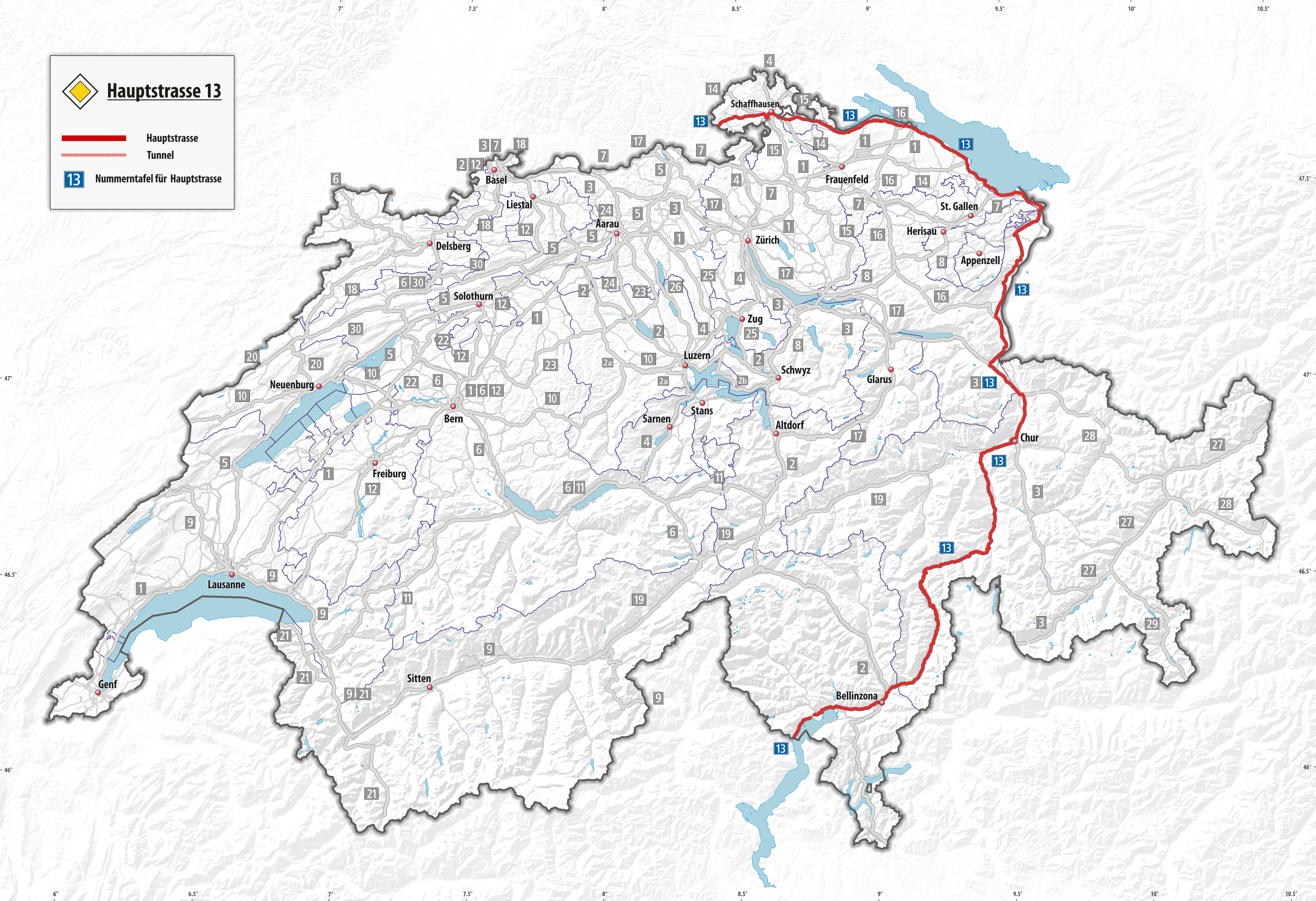
- Location of the H13 in Switzerland

Route information
- Length: 320 km (200 mi)

Location
- Country: Switzerland

Highway system
- Transport in Switzerland; Motorways

The Hauptstrasse 13 is a main road (“Hauptstrasse”) in the Swiss cantons of Schaffhausen, Zürich, Thurgau, St. Gallen, Grisons and Ticino. This main road begins at the German border at Trasadingen at the Bundesstraße 34 and ends at the Strada Statale 34 at the Italian border at Brissago. Between the border crossing Trasadingen / Erzingen and the A4 at Schaffhausen it is part of European route E54. The total length of Hauptstrasse 13 is approximately 320 kilometers.

It runs from the border crossing Trasadingen/Erzingen on the German border via Neunkirch, the Galgenbucktunnel at Neuhausen am Rheinfall, Schaffhausen and leads over Rheinbrücke to Feuerthalen. From there, it follows the Swiss bank of the Rhine and the Hochrhein along via Diessenhofen to Stein am Rhein, along the Untersee via Steckborn to Bodensee to Kreuzlingen. There it forms the main connecting road along the Swiss bank of the Rhine via Romanshorn, Arbon and Rorschach to St. Margrethen. Further up the Alpine Rhine to Chur, over the San Bernardino Pass to Bellinzona and further to Locarno to the Italian border. Between Arbon and Bellinzona Süd, it is supplemented by a motorway or highway as the main traffic axis. Their route (via the high-quality roads) leads between Arbon and Meggenhus junction via the A1.1, then to St. Margrethen via the A1. From there, your route runs to the Bellinzona Nord junction via the A 13 and the short remainder is still via the A2.

== History ==
=== Thurgau ===
The Thurgau was until 1803 a common rule, which was administered jointly by the federal city-states. Since 1803, the newly founded canton of Thurgau had had its own tax revenue and decided on an extensive road construction program. In 1806, the government decided to build a road between the Schaffhausen canton border at Paradies and the St. Gallen canton border at Horn, which runs along the southern shore of Lake Constance.
