= 2024 Sulawesi landslide =

Landslide that struck a remote Indonesian gold mine

- Date: 6 July 2024
- Location: Bone Bolango, Gorontalo, Indonesia
- Cause: Torrential rain
- Deaths: 27
- Injuries: 18
- Missing: 15

The 2024 Sulawesi landslide was a mass casualty event that occurred at an unauthorized gold mine in the Bone Bolango regency located in Gorontalo province on the island of Sulawesi, Indonesia, on 6 July 2024. The disaster occurred as a result of heavy rainfall causing a landslide that struck over 100 villagers digging for gold at the site of the gold mine, killing at least twelve people and leaving about 48 more missing.

== Background ==
Unauthorized mining operations frequently take place in Indonesia, exposing many workers to environmental hazards such as floods, landslides, and tunnel collapses, as well as toxic exposure to mercury and cyanide during gold ore processing frequently with minimal to no protection. Several disasters involving mining in Indonesia have occurred, including a landslide in April 2022 at Mandailing Natal in North Sumatra, killing 12 women working at an illegal gold mining operation. Another disaster took place in February 2019 at a North Sulawesi illegal gold mine, where several mining holes caused a wooden structure to collapse, burying and killing over 40 people.

Starting on 6 July, torrential rains struck several regions of Indonesia including Bone Bolango, which caused an embankment to break, resulting in floods reaching as high as 3 meters (10 feet) deep in five villages, impacting nearly 300 houses, and forcing over 1,000 people to evacuate.

== Disaster ==
On 6 July, several tons of mud and debris slid down several hills surrounding the gold mine before crashing into an unauthorized mining camp of over 100 villagers, burying their makeshift settlements as well as several houses of residents living near the gold mine. At least twelve people were killed in the landslide and had to be pulled out of the mud, including a four-year-old child and three women. 44 people were able to escape the landslide, while six more people were pulled out with injuries. Roughly 48 people were reported missing following the initial landslide.

== Rescue ==
Around 164 personnel were dispatched to the site of the disaster for rescue and recovery. Rescue operations were complicated by heavy rainfall and other landslides blocking roads necessary to get to the site of the disaster, forcing personnel to walk over 20 kilometers (12.43 miles) to reach the encampment. Torrential rainfall forced rescue personnel to temporarily cease operations on the evening of 8 July.

By 9 July, rescuers were able to recover 23 bodies and rescue 23 more living villagers, including 18 who were injured, leaving 35 more people missing. Detection dogs were brought to the site to aid in recovery, while video taken from Indonesia's National Search and Rescue Agency showed rescuers using farm tools and their bare hands to dig out deceased villagers from the rubble. The search operations were called off on 13 July, after a total of 27 people had been confirmed dead, with a further 15 still missing.

== See also ==
- 2024 Sumatra flash floods
- 2023 Serasan landslide
- 2014 Banjarnegara landslide
