= Southport Historic District =

Southport Historic District may refer to:

- Southport Historic District (Fairfield, Connecticut), listed on the NRHP in Connecticut
- Southport Historic District (Southport, North Carolina), listed on the NRHP in North Carolina
