= Brunswick County Courthouse =

Brunswick County Courthouse may refer to:

- Brunswick County Courthouse (North Carolina), Southport, North Carolina
- Brunswick County Courthouse (Virginia), Lawrenceville, Virginia
