= Old Brunswick County Courthouse (North Carolina) =

Historic courthouse in North Carolina, US

- Brunswick County Courthouse
- U.S. National Register of Historic Places
- U.S. Historic district – Contributing property
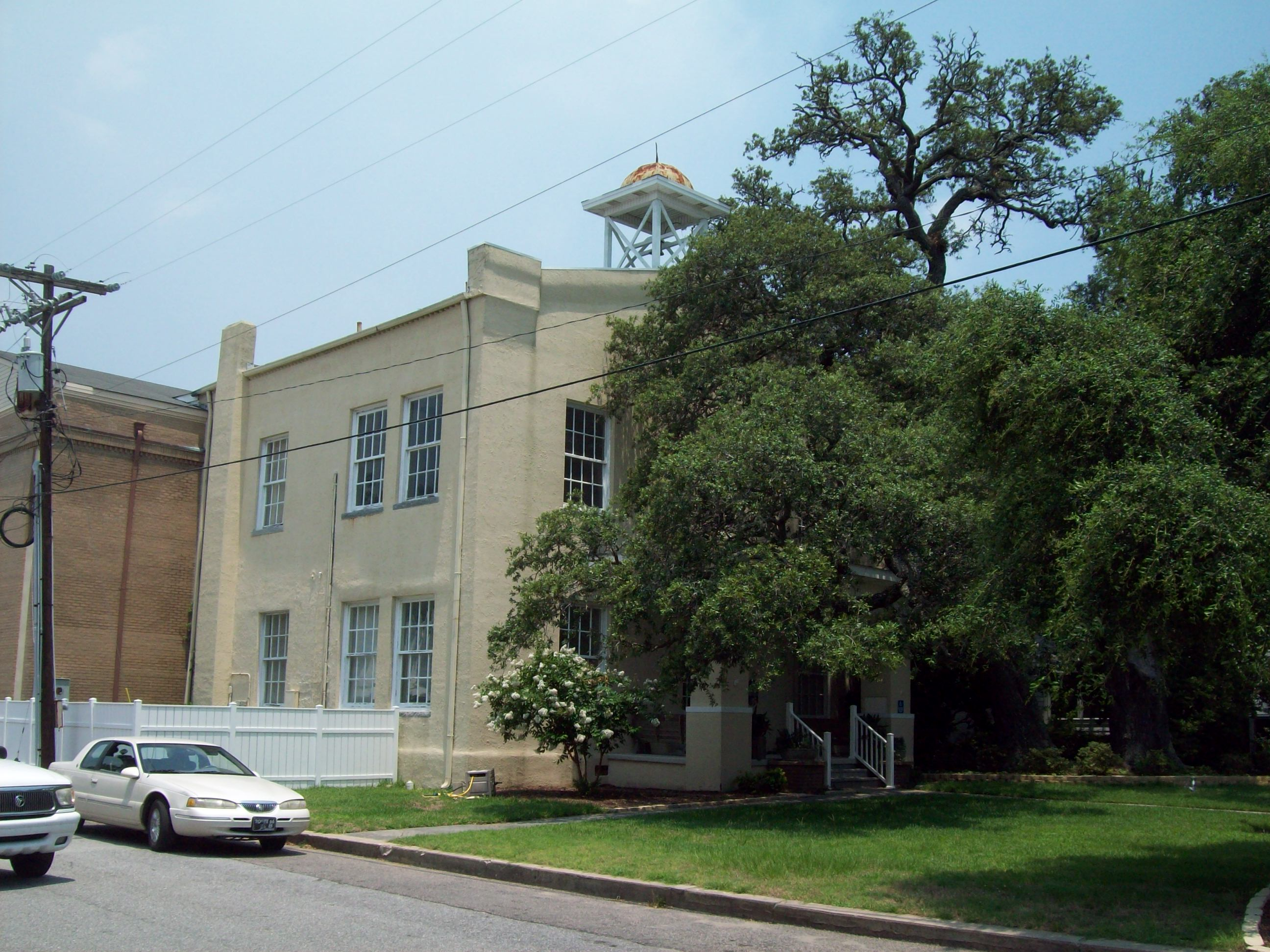
- Old Brunswick County Courthouse

- Location within North Carolina Location within the United States
- Location: Davis and Moore Sts., Southport, North Carolina
- Coordinates: 33°55′8″N 78°1′5″W
- Built: 1844
- Architect: Morrell, W.D.; Robbins, A.J.
- MPS: North Carolina County Courthouses TR
- NRHP reference No.: 79001663
- Added to NRHP: May 10, 1979

The Old Brunswick County Courthouse is an historic former courthouse located at Southport, Brunswick County, North Carolina. It was erected about 1844, and is a plain, two-story, stuccoed brick building three bays wide by seven bays long.

It was added to the National Register of Historic Places in 1979. It is located in the Southport Historic District.

The original courthouse was built in Brunswick Town 1729–1731. This courthouse had served New Hanover County, which included Brunswick, until Brunswick was formed in 1764. The building was destroyed by the Great Chesapeake Bay Hurricane of 1769.

The General Assembly, meeting in New Bern in 1778, authorized and empowered Brunswick to levy a tax on its inhabitants to construct a new courthouse at a location convenient to its citizens and within two miles of Lockwoods Folly. The Act said "the courts of said county will be held at John Bell's until the County Court House shalI be built." John Bell's plantation had been chosen as the site of the new courthouse, but until it was built it was expected that court business would be conducted in his home if necessary. This was during the time of the American Revolution so progress was slow.

Another Act of 1784 decreed that William Goss, Sam Leonard, Louis Dupree, Jacob Leonard, and Henry Walters were named "as Commissioners, for agreeing with and employing proper workmen to build a good and substantial court house, prison and stocks, and that they are hereby empowered to purchase five acres of land where they, or a majority of them, shall find most convenient within the distances above described."

Samuel Leonard and Louis Dupree served as Majors, and Jacob Leonard as a captain, in the Brunswick Militia during the American Revolution. William Goss (Gause) lost a leg in the war and was a member of the North Carolina House of Commons in 1778. William Gause and his wife Elizabeth Bacot Gause hosted President George Washington for breakfast on April 27, 1791, during his Southern Tour.

The location on John Bell's plantation (now Supply), near the Georgetown Road, was used for court business until the General Assembly, meeting in Raleigh in December 1808, issued an Act to remove the Court of Brunswick County from Lockwoods Folly to Smithville (later Southport). That Act noted that many beneficial effects would result from the move and that Smithville represented a large majority of Brunswick inhabitants.

It was 36 years until the "new" courthouse of 1844 was completed. This could be due to the fact that no special tax was levied to build the structure, and relied primarily on private or voluntary subscriptions to complete. The Smithville courthouse was altered in 1922 after a fire in the Register of Deeds office.

Another move came in 1977 when Bolivia became the county seat, then considered the "center" of the county's population. A new courthouse was constructed at the new county complex, which was itself replaced with a new courthouse building in 2001. From 1979 to 2014, the former courthouse served as Southport City Hall. In 2014, the City of Southport relocated City Hall to a new building, and the Southport Police Department left the building in 2016. There are plans to restore the building as a community arts center.
