= Southport Historic District (Southport, North Carolina) =

Historic district in North Carolina, United States

- U.S. National Register of Historic Places
- U.S. Historic district
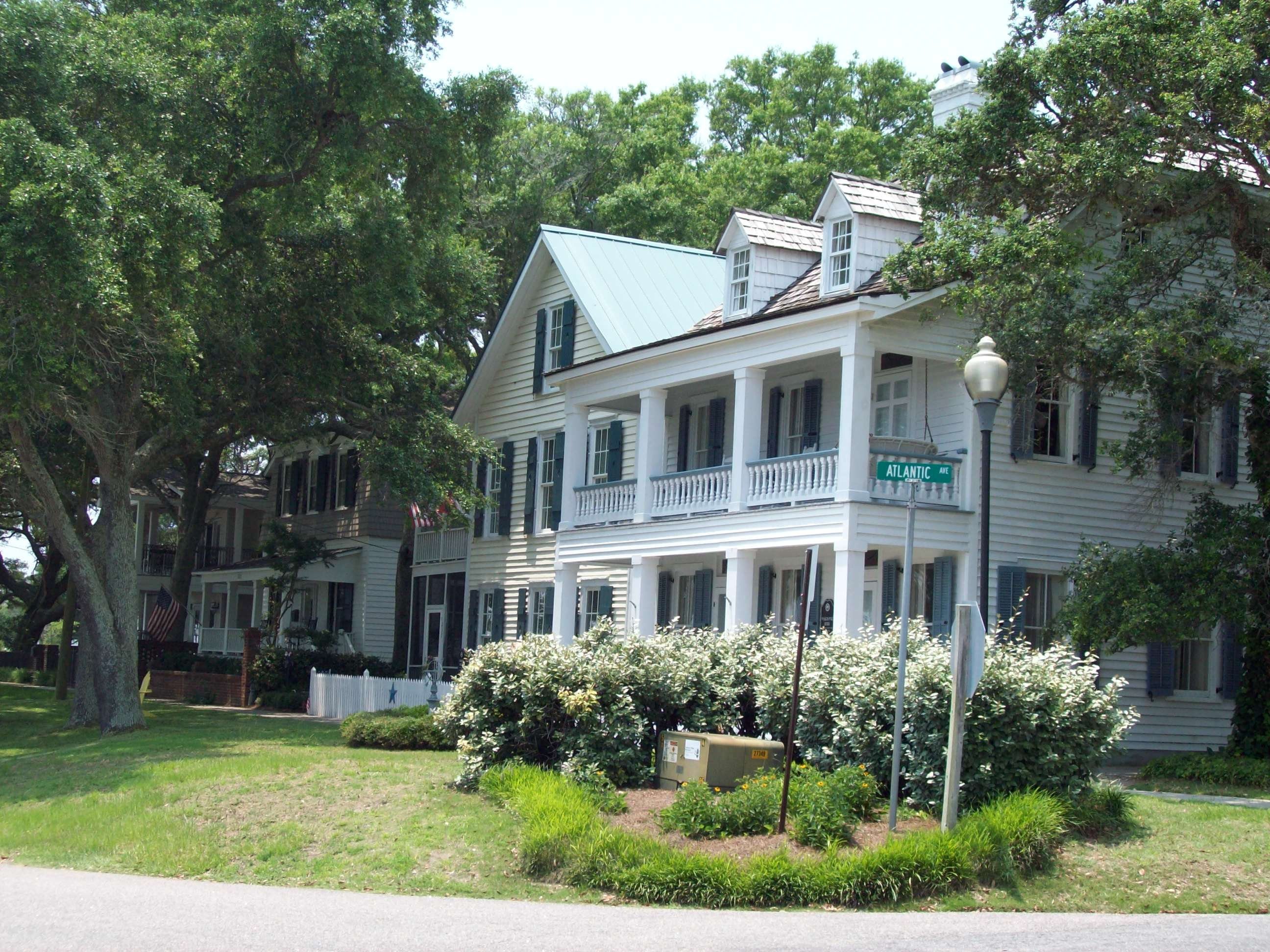
- Southport Historic District, June 2010

- Location within North Carolina Location within the United States
- Location: Roughly bounded by Cape Fear River, Rhett, Bay, Short and Brown Sts., Southport, North Carolina
- Coordinates: 33°55′09″N 78°01′13″W
- Area: 112 acres (45 ha)
- Architect: Robbins, A.J.; Et al.
- NRHP reference No.: 80002801
- Added to NRHP: November 25, 1980

Southport Historic District is a national historic district located at Southport, Brunswick County, North Carolina. The district encompasses 161 contributing buildings, 3 contributing sites, and 1 contributing object. Over half of the structures in the historic district date from the 1885-1905 period. It includes residential, commercial, and institutional buildings and is considered the best example of a Victorian coastal town in North Carolina. Notable buildings include the River Pilots Tower and Building (1940s), Frying Pan Lightship (20th century), Fort Johnston Officers Quarters (c. 1805-09), Walker-Pike House (c. 1800-20), Brunswick Inn (c. 1859), Fort Johnston Hospital (c. 1852-1860), Former Brunswick County Court House (c. 1854), Saint Philips Episcopal Church (c. 1860, 1894–96), Trinity Methodist Church (1888-1890), and the Adkins-Ruark House (1890).

It was added to the National Register of Historic Places in 1980.

== Gallery ==
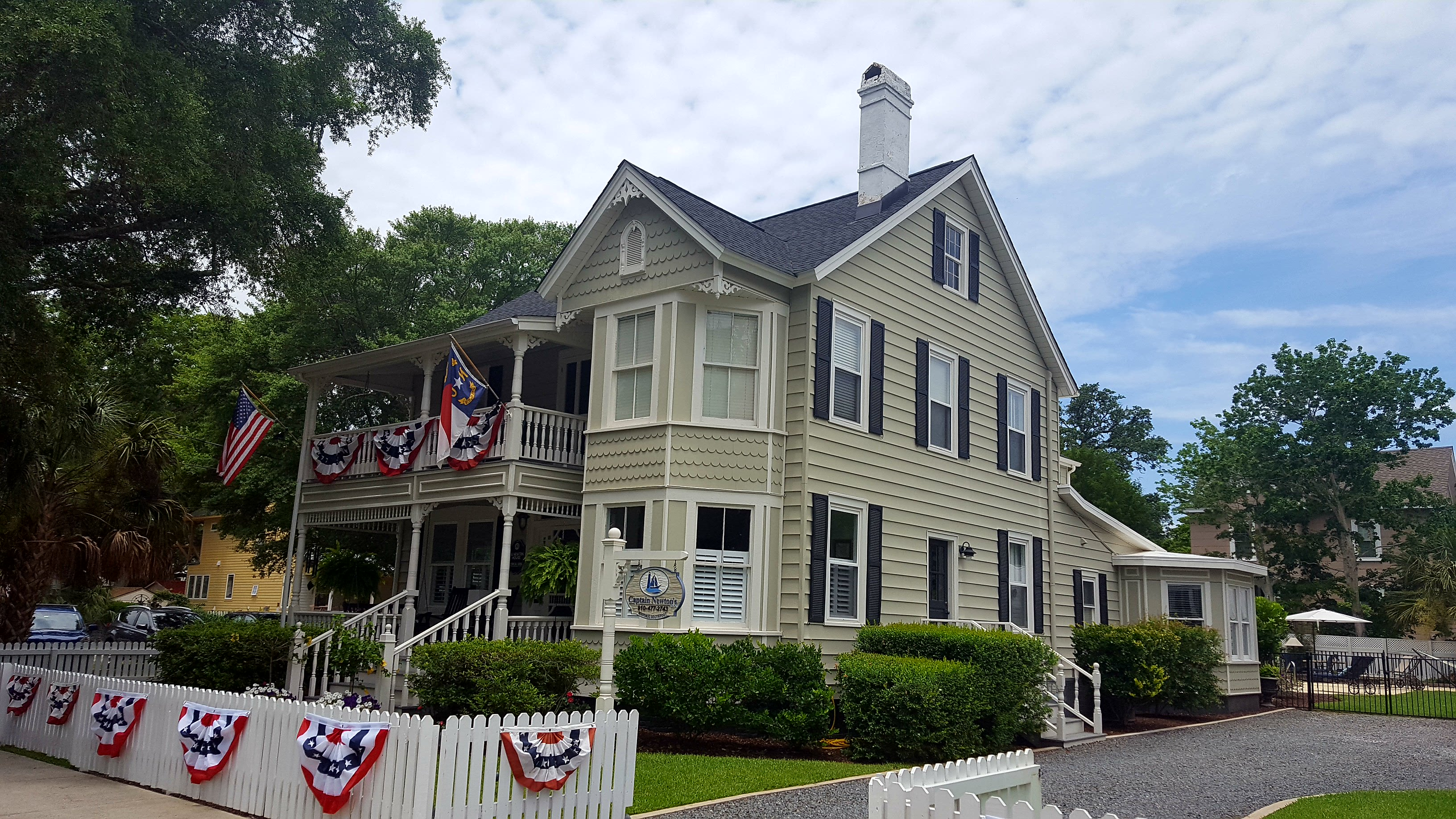
W. Newton House, 2016

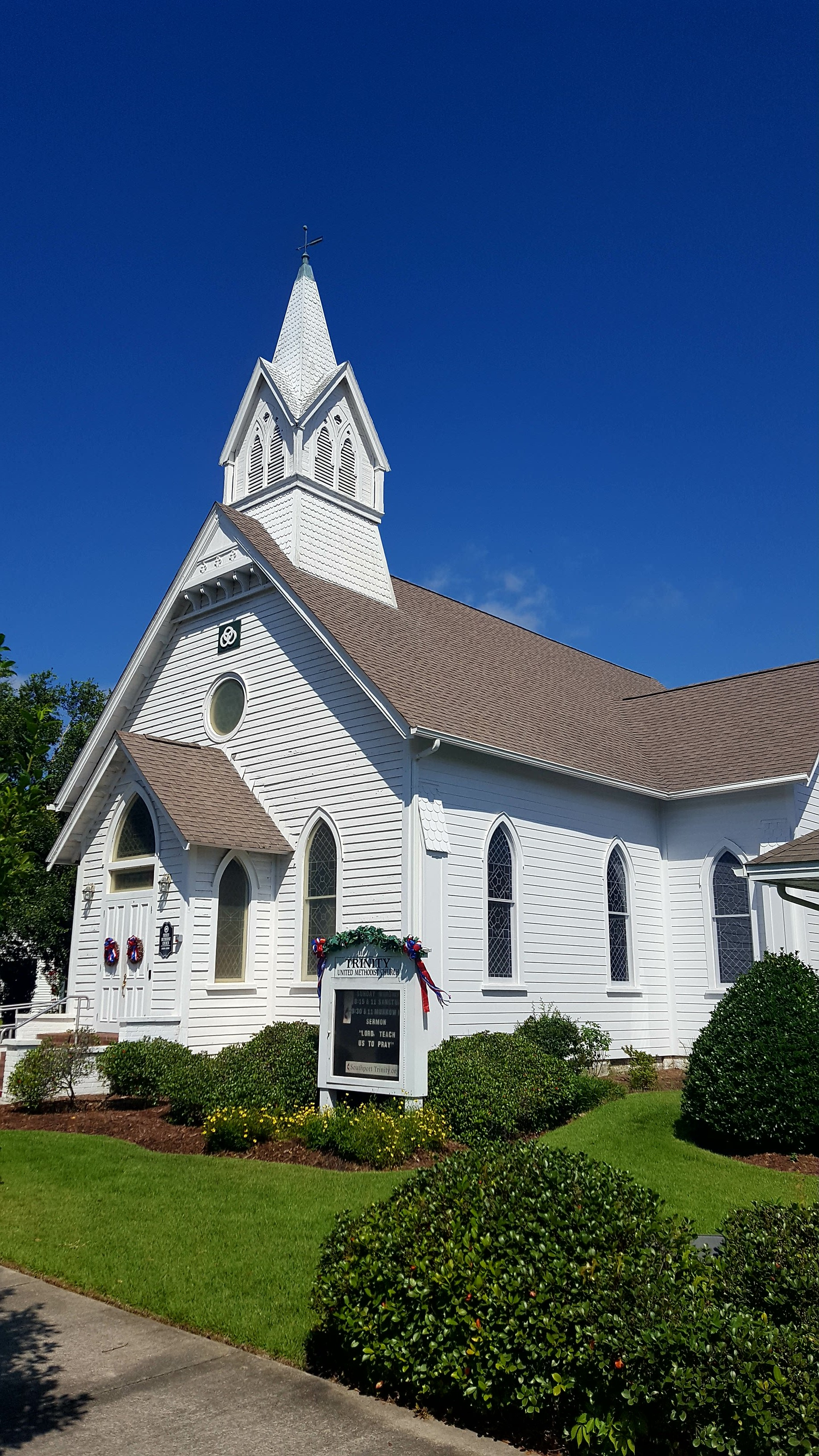
Trinity United Methodist Church, 2016

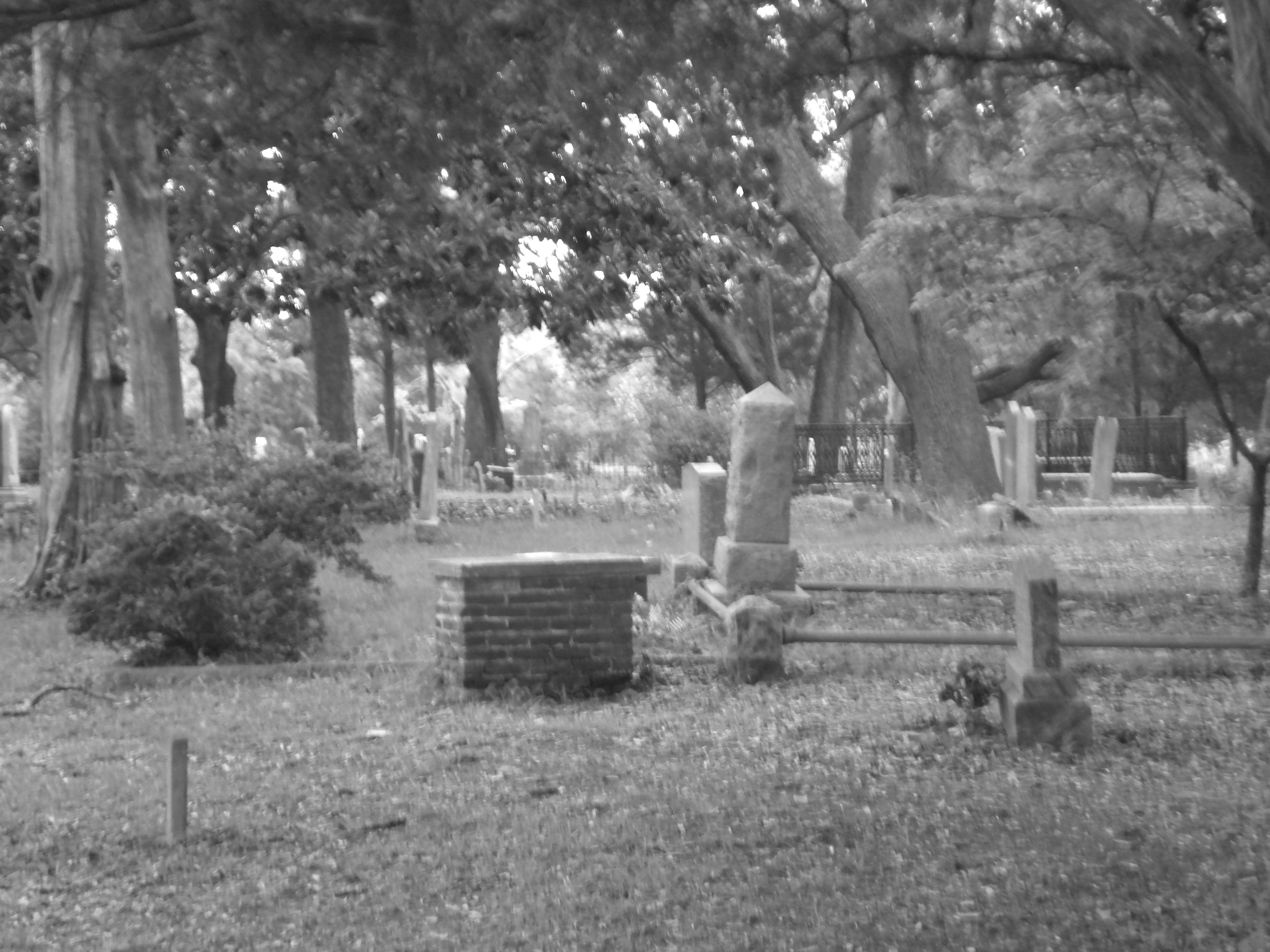
Smithfield Burial Ground, 2010

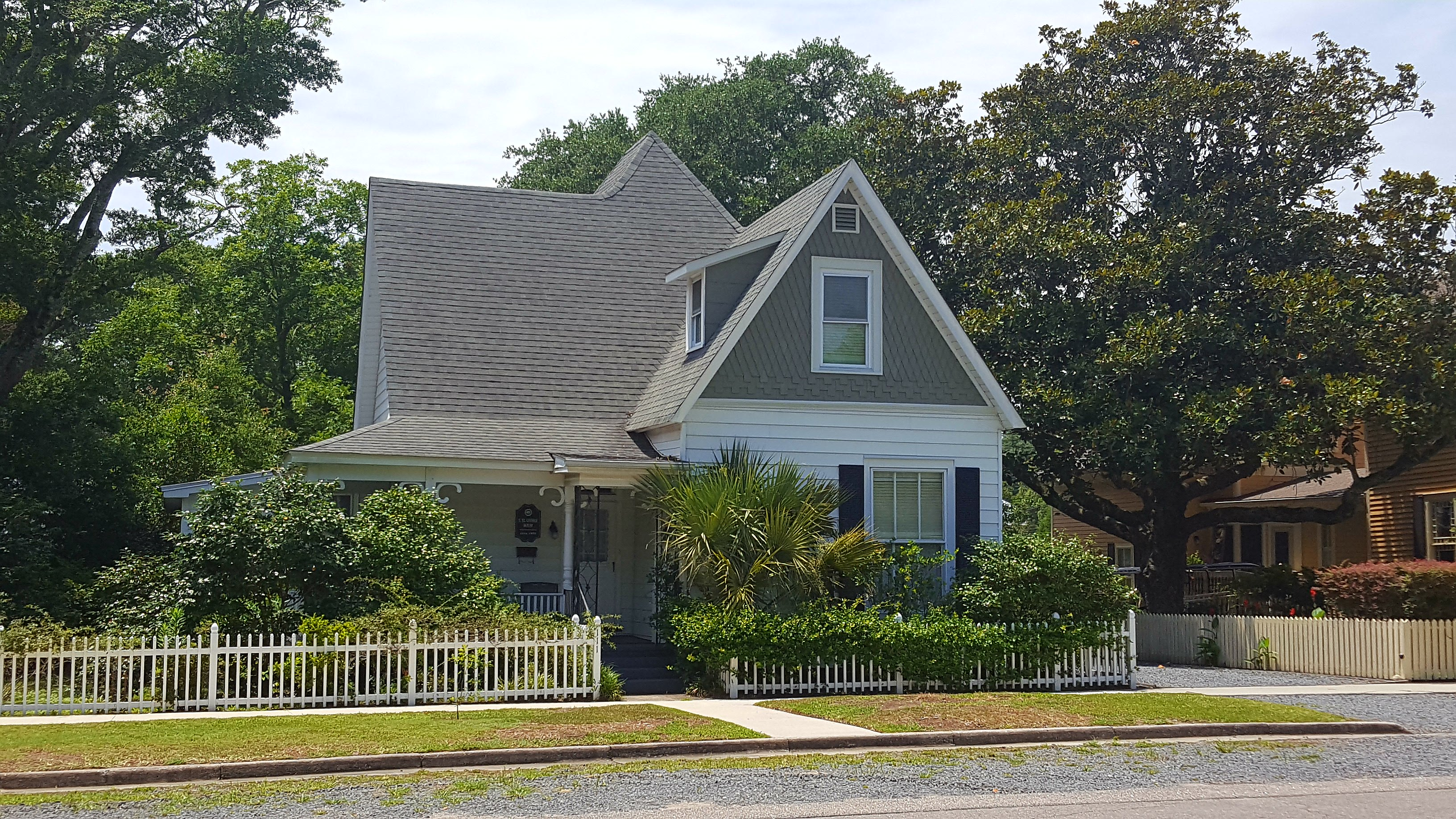
T. St. George House, 2016

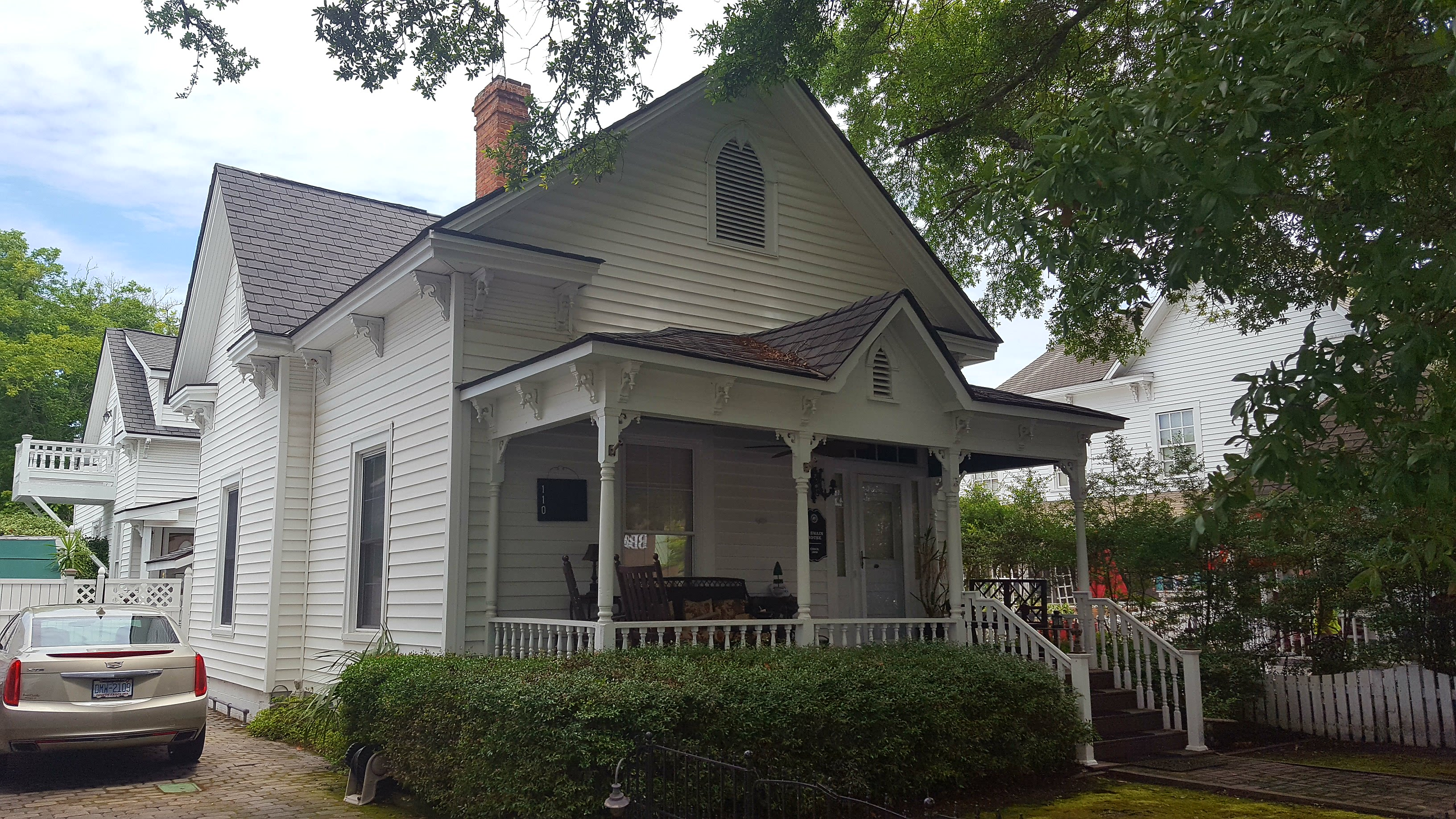
S. Swain House, 2016

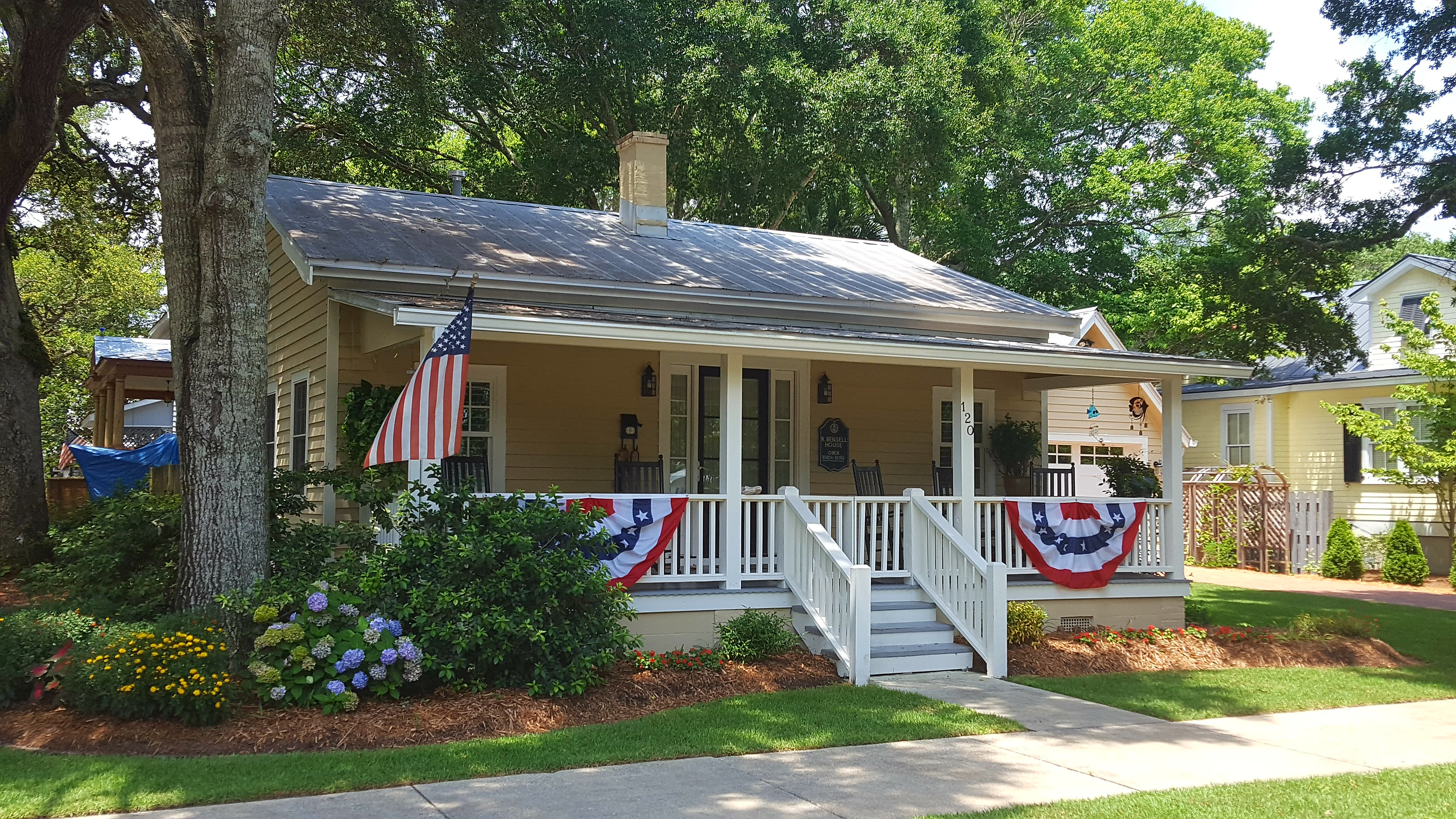
Richard Bensell House, 2016

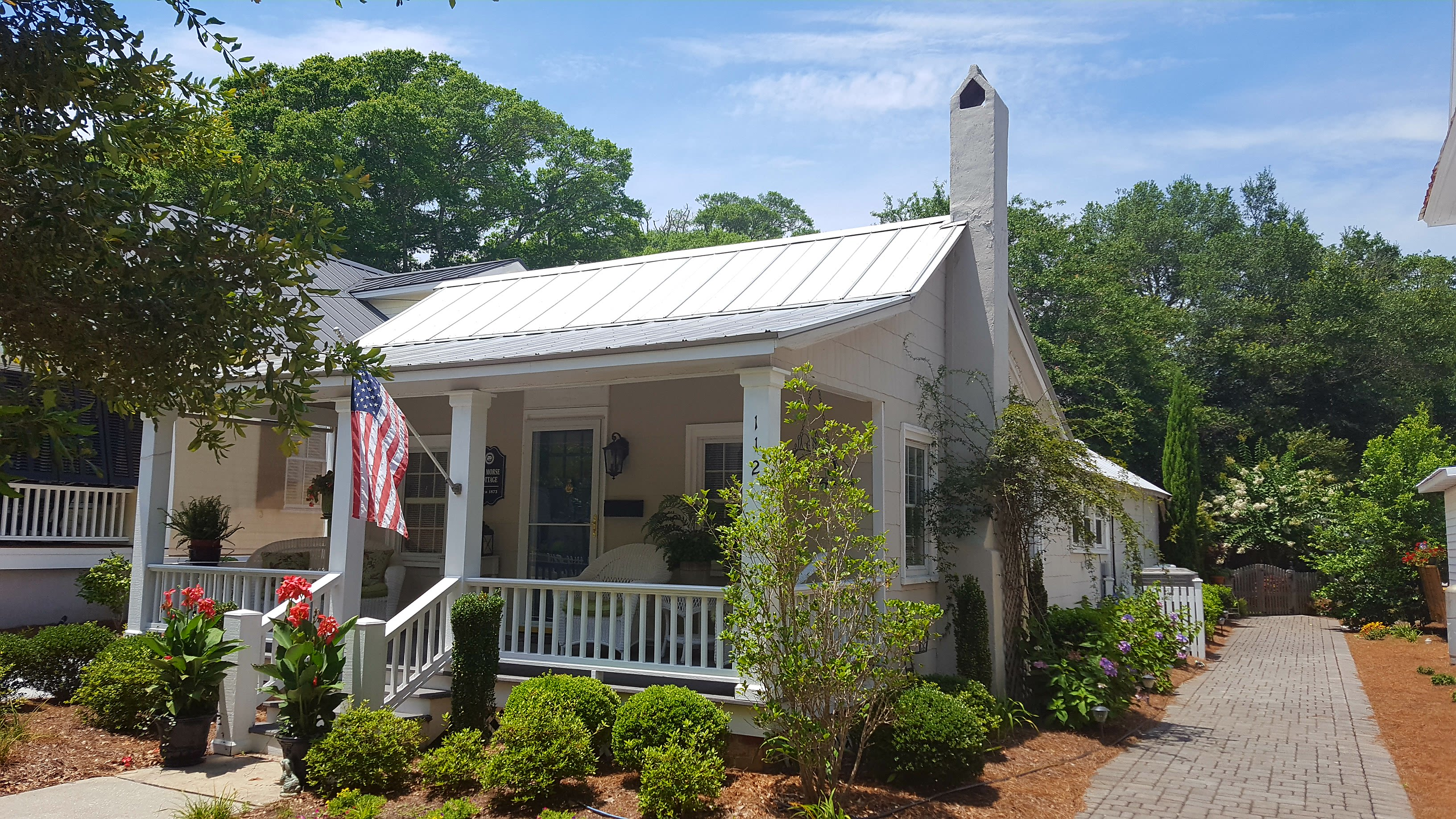
Morse Cottage, 2016

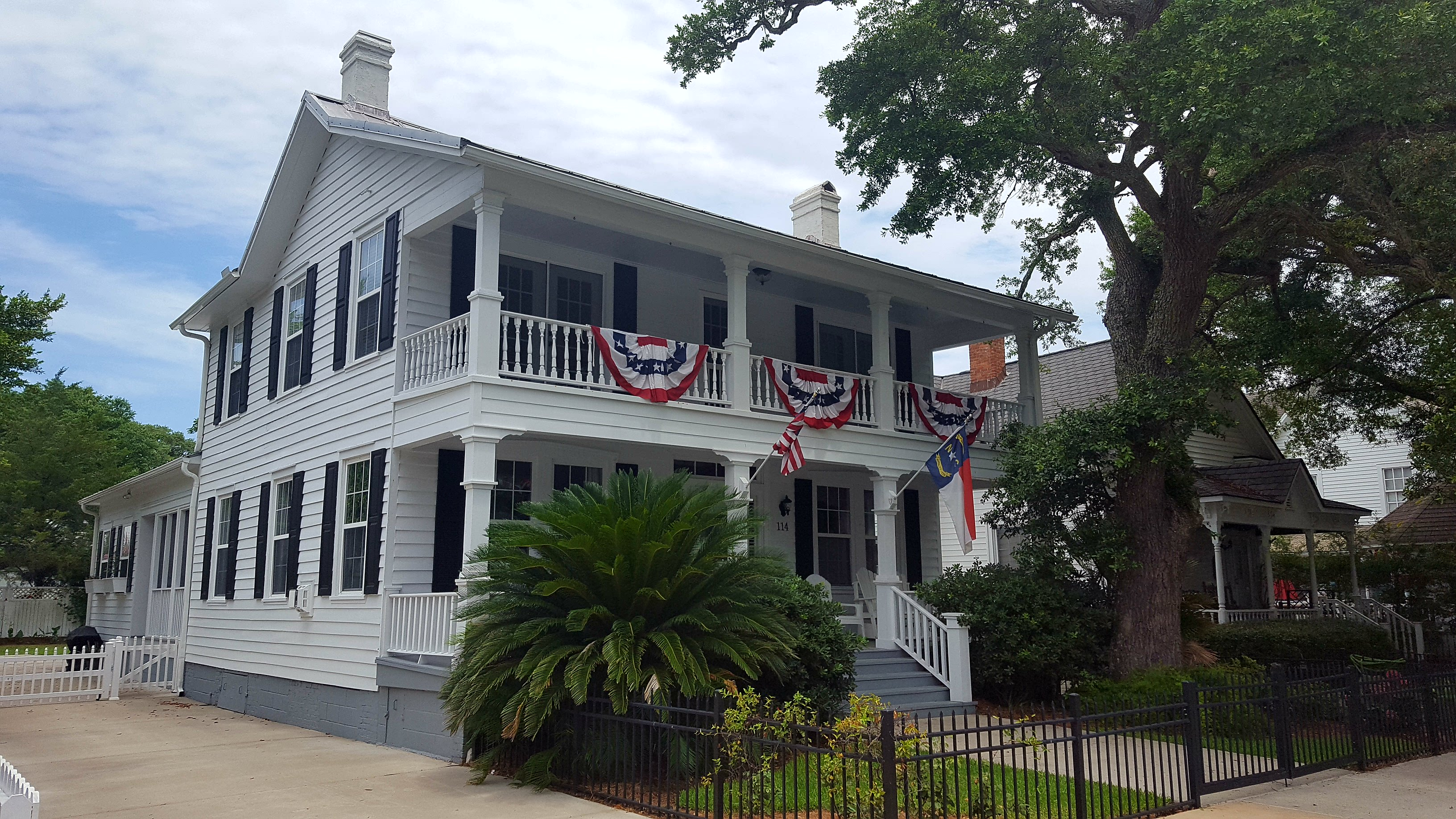
Julius Newton House, 2016

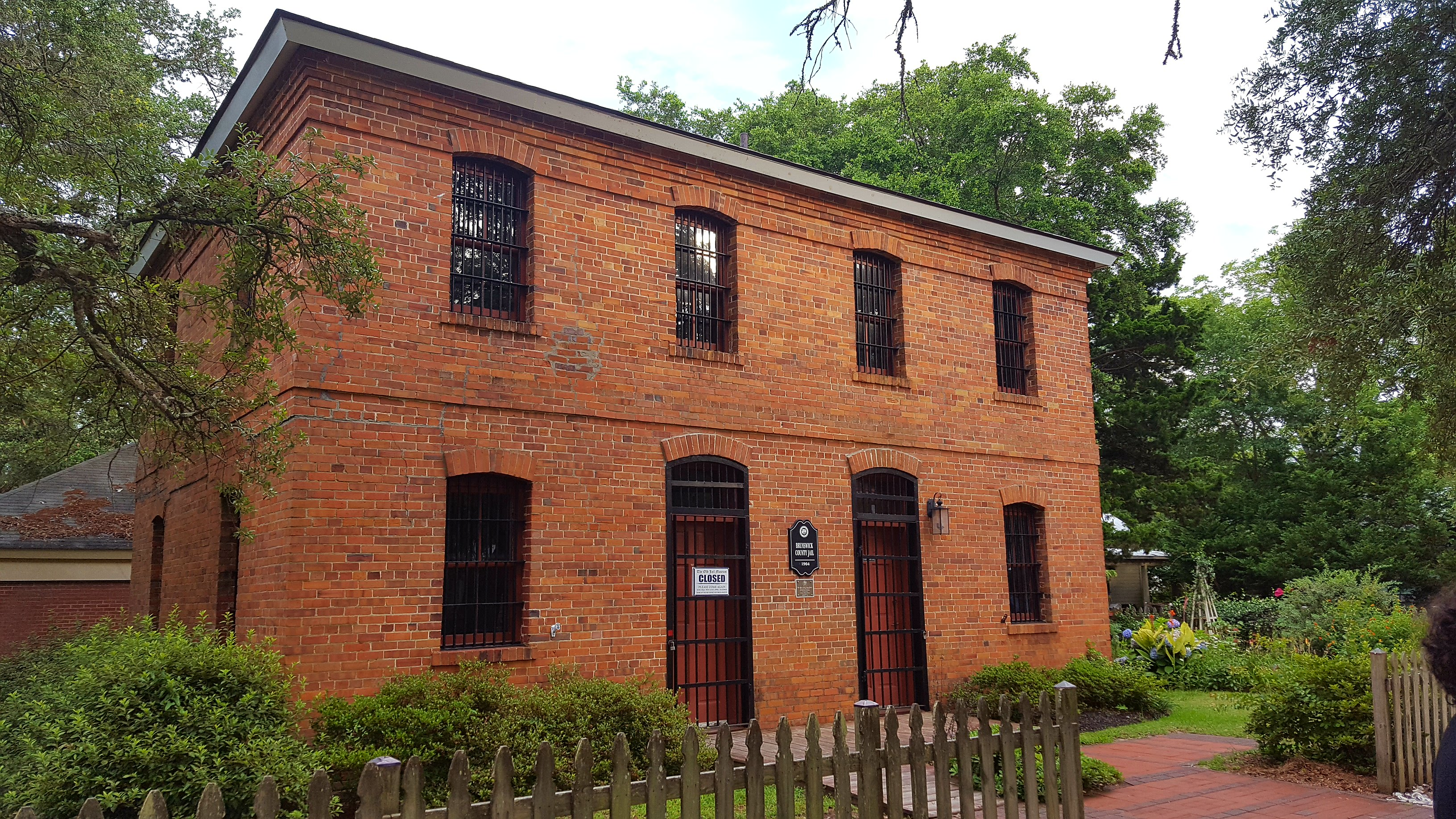
Former Brunswick County Jail, 2016

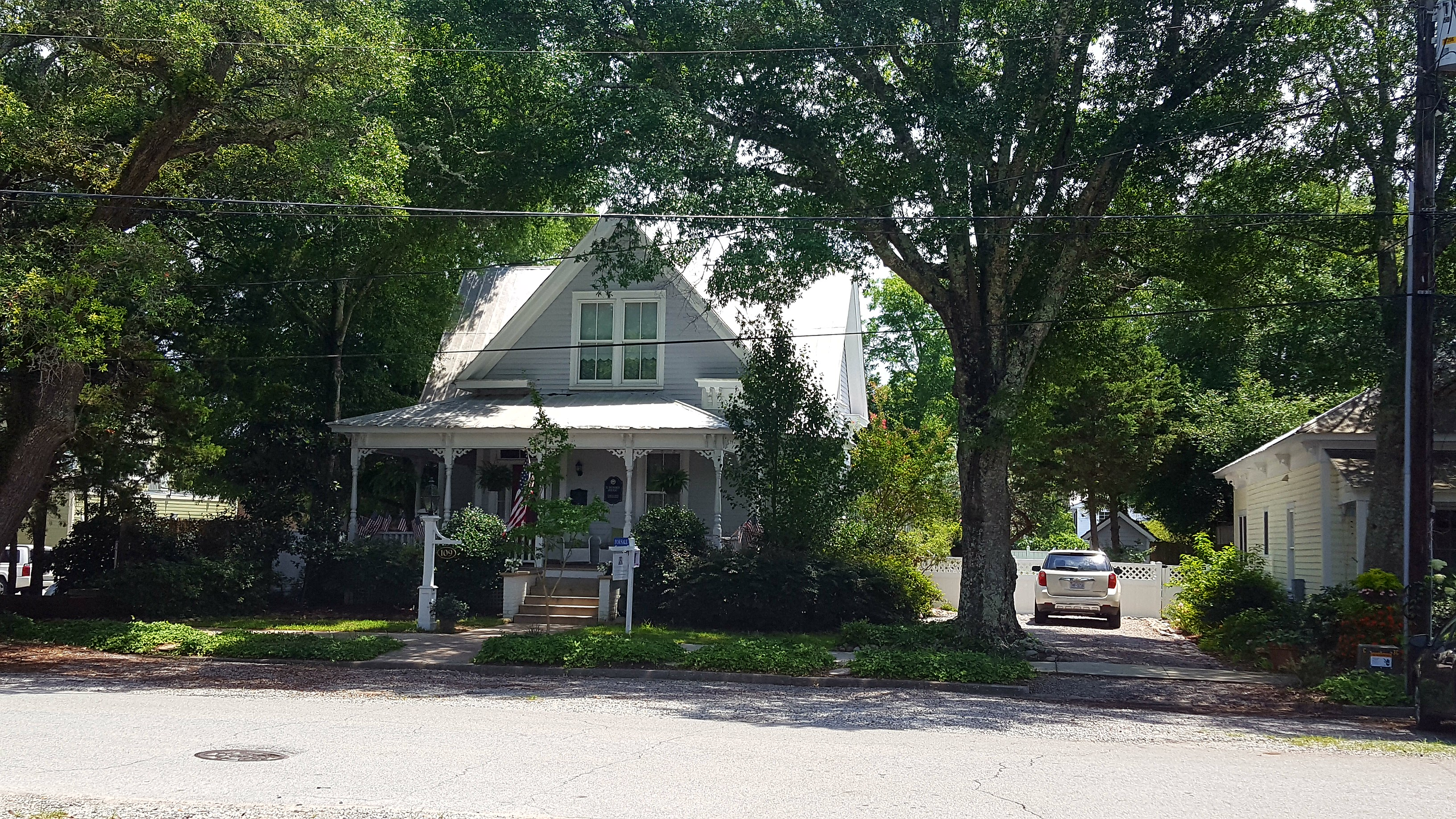
Daniel Bender House, 2016

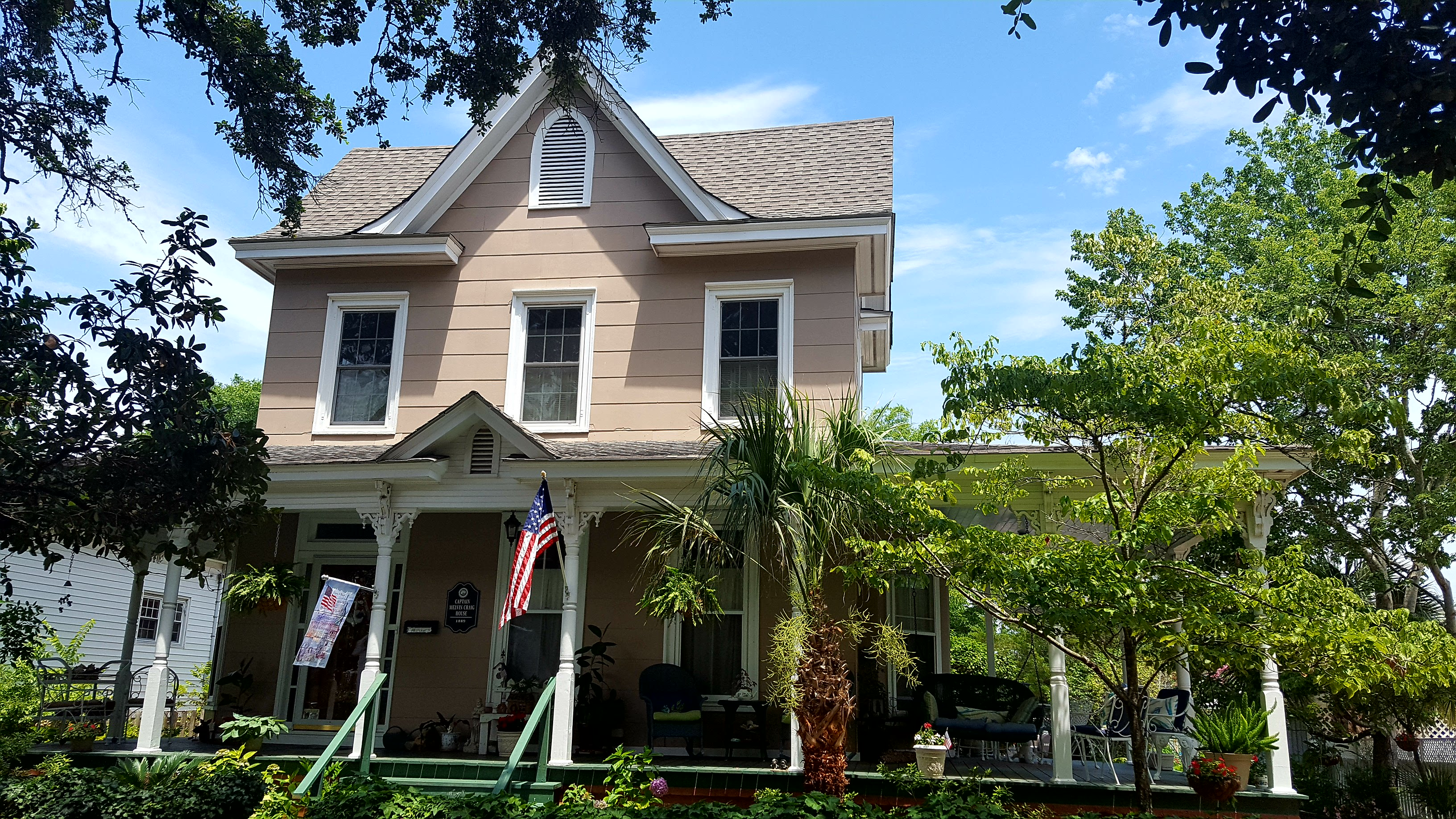
Captain Melvin Craig House, 2016

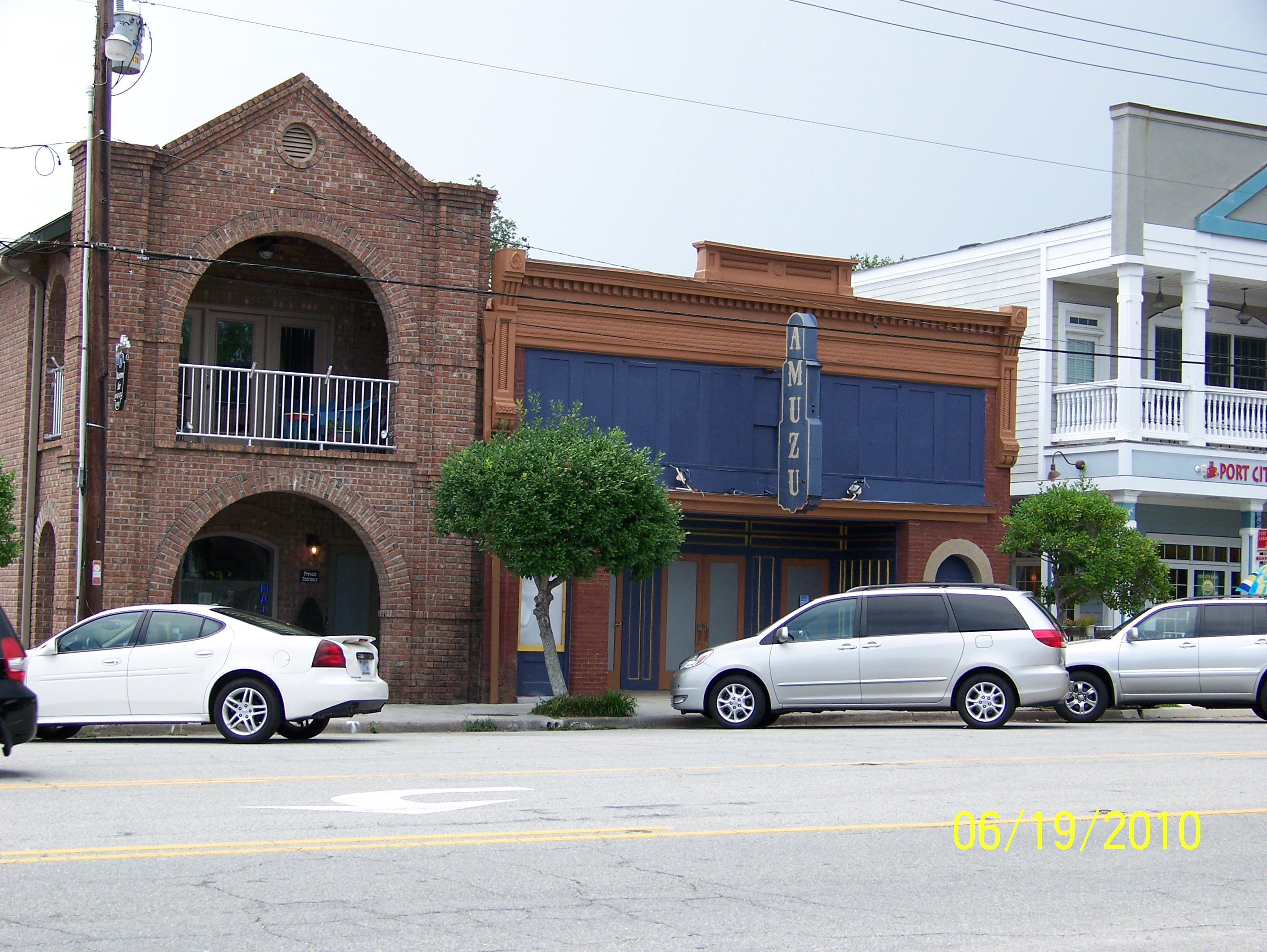
Amuzu Theater, 2010

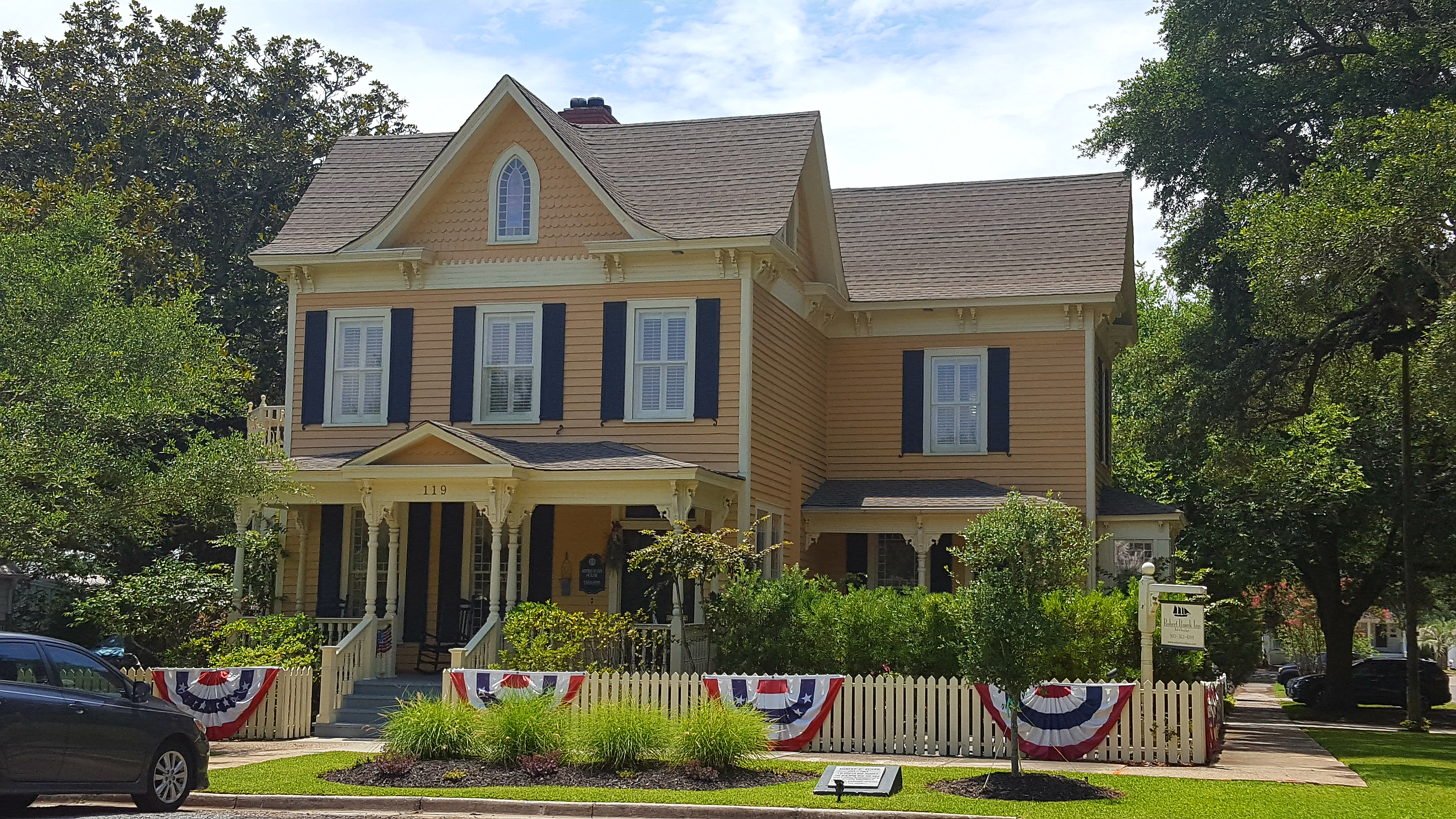
Adkins-Ruark House, 2016

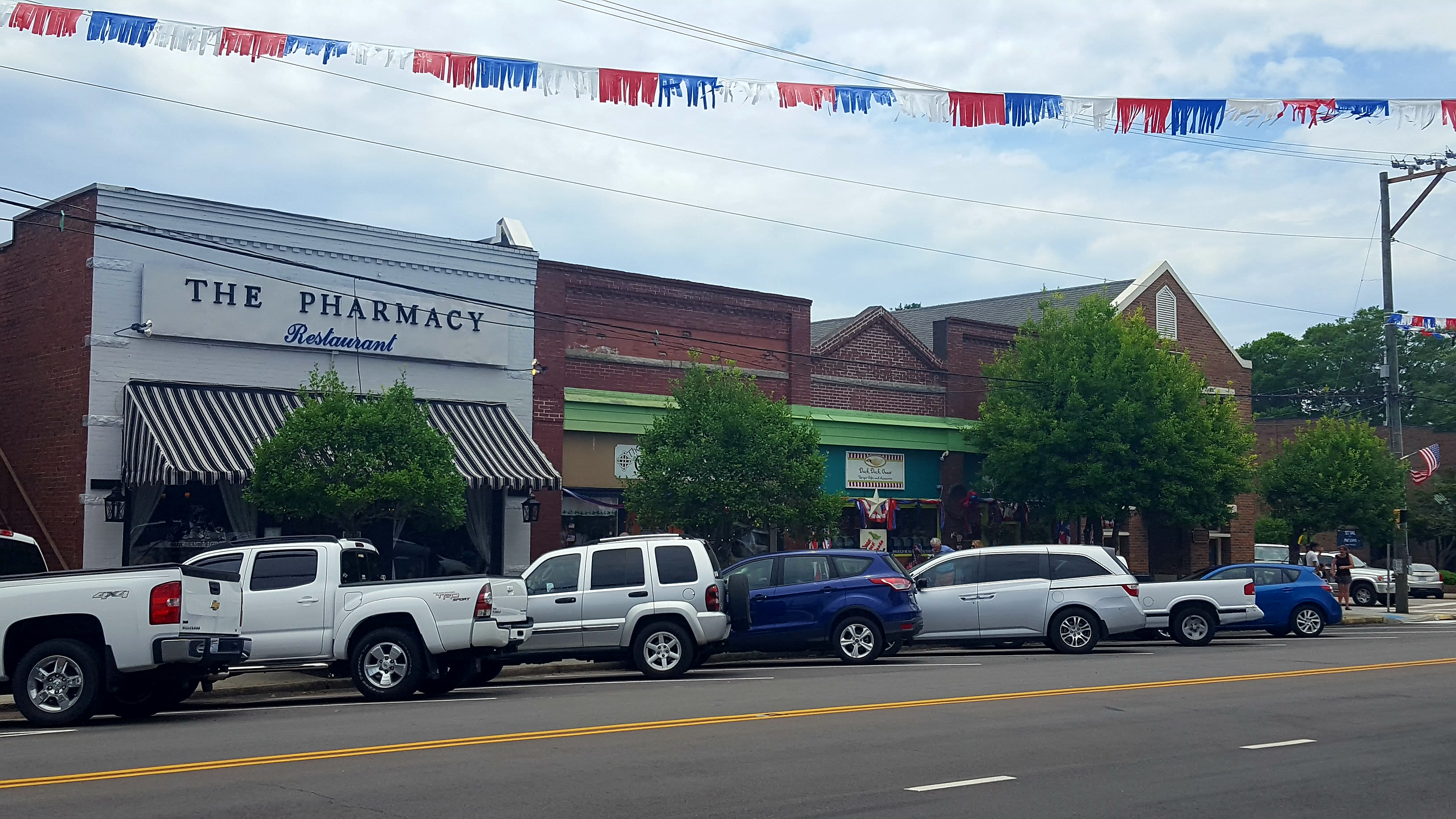
Watson's Pharmacy & Commercial Block, 2016

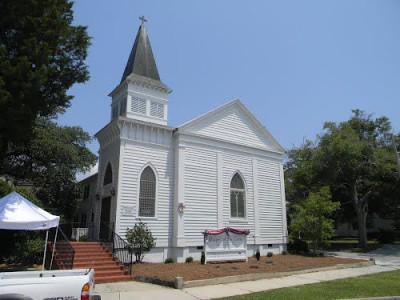
St Phillips Episcopal Church, 2016

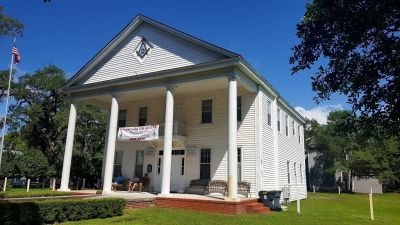
Southport Masonic Lodge, 2016
