= Pollution in California =

Overview of pollution in the U.S. state of California

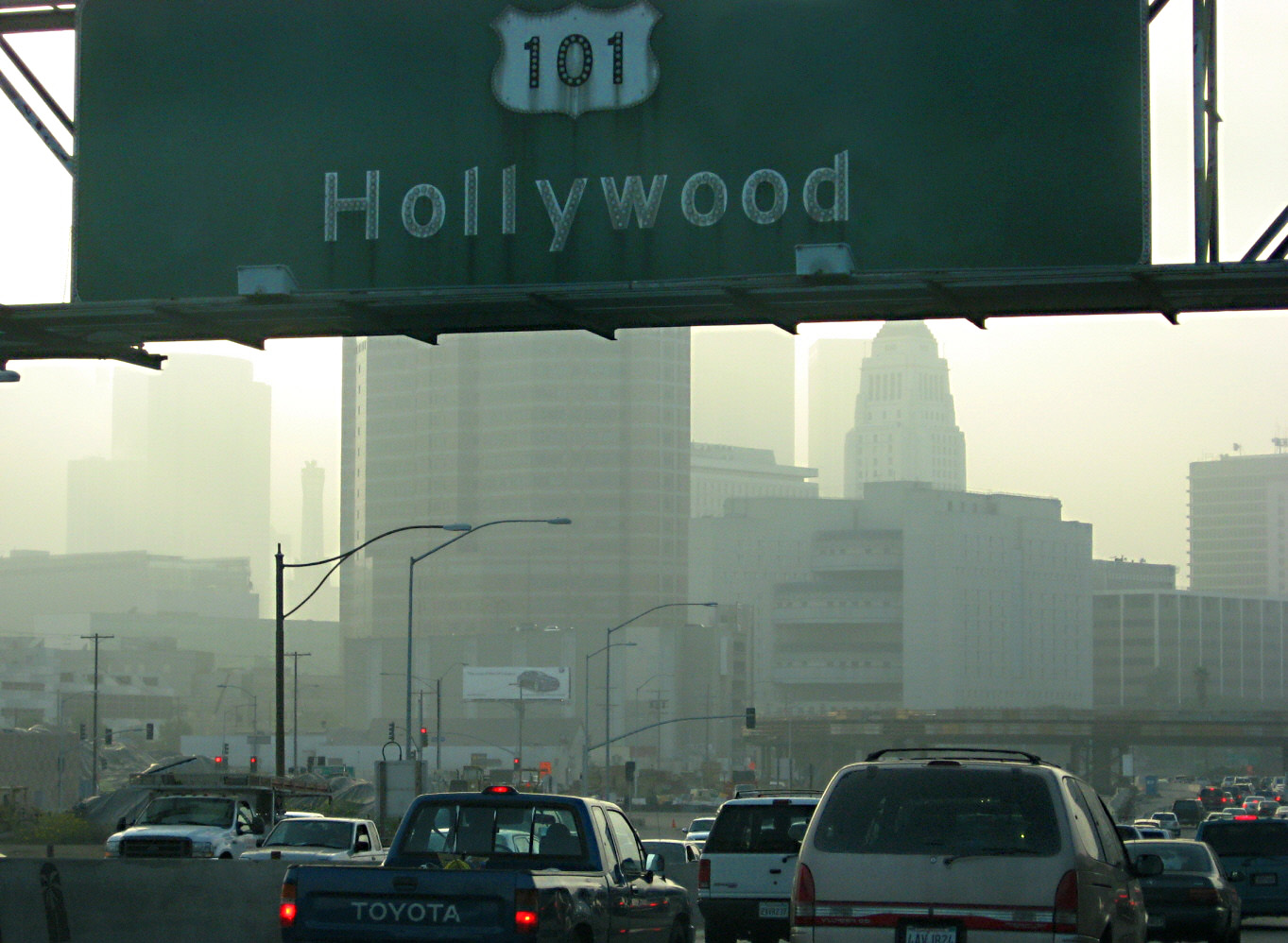
A view of Los Angeles covered in smog

Pollution in California relates to the degree of pollution in the air, water, and land of the U.S. state of California. Pollution is defined as the addition of any substance (solid, liquid, or gas) or any form of energy (such as heat, sound, or radioactivity) to the environment at a faster rate than it can be dispersed, diluted, decomposed, recycled, or stored in some harmless form. The combination of three main factors is the cause of notable unhealthy levels of air pollution in California: the activities of over 39 million people, a mountainous terrain that traps pollution, and a warm climate that helps form ozone and other pollutants. Eight of the ten cities in the US with the highest year-round concentration of particulate matter between 2013 and 2015 were in California, and seven out of the ten cities in the US with the worst ozone pollution were also in California. Studies show that pollutants prevalent in California are linked to several health issues, including asthma, lung cancer, birth complications, and premature death. In 2016, Bakersfield, California recorded the highest level of airborne pollutants of any city in the United States.

The Federal Clean Water Act defines water pollution as "dredge spoil, solid waste, incinerator residue, sewage, garbage, sewage sludge, munitions, chemical wastes, biological materials, heat, wrecked or discarded equipment, rock, sand, cellar dirt, and industrial, municipal, and agricultural waste discharged into water." In 2011, an Environmental Protection Agency (EPA) study showed that water quality standards were not met on 1.6 million acres of California's 3 million acres of lakes, bays, wetlands, and estuaries. The Porter-Cologne Water Quality Control Act governs the water quality regulation in California.

There is also an effect on agricultural sector of extreme weather, sea level rise, and wildfires. After the 2024 election there was a change of government interaction with global climate policies. Now in 2025 president Donald Trump withdrew the United States from the Paris Agreement. With Clean Air Act (CAA) there is a limit of certain containment pollutions in efforts to help clean the air. This limits many industrial and chemical plants in the amount of releasing chemical pollutants.

== History ==
In 1943, people first recognized episodes of smog-causing irritated eyes, burning lungs, and nausea, and this led people to walk the city's streets wearing masks to shield the thick air. Beginning in 1967, a group of California politicians and leaders teamed up to unify statewide efforts to address the severe air pollution, creating The Mulford-Carrell Air Resources Act, which formed the California Air Resources Board (CARB). That same year, the Federal Air Quality Act of 1967 was enacted, which allowed California to set more stringent air quality rules due to its unique conditions of geography, weather, and growing population. Despite dramatic progress, air pollution in the United States, and California in particular, continues to harm people's health and environment. Under the Clean Air Act (United States) of 1970, the EPA works with state and local governments and federal agencies to reduce air pollution and limit the damage that it causes. The Act was amended in 1977 and 1990, establishing emission standards that require the maximum degree of reduction of hazardous air pollutants.

The CARB continues to work with local governments, the business sector, and the public to address California's air quality problems. In the past decade, California has become a global leader in climate change by entering agreements with several nations and linking cap-and-trade programs with Quebec. Many programs have been established to reduce greenhouse gas emissions, including a Zero Emission Vehicle mandate, which is planned to clean up the transportation sector and add about 1.5 million hydrogen fuel cell vehicles to the roads by 2025. The cap-and-trade program has allowed billions of dollars to be invested in reducing greenhouse gases in cities throughout California. While California has taken significant action to decrease pollution, the state remains behind the rest of the nation. The ever-growing population, abundance of cars, and sunny weather continue to foster a pollution-friendly environment.

== Air pollution ==
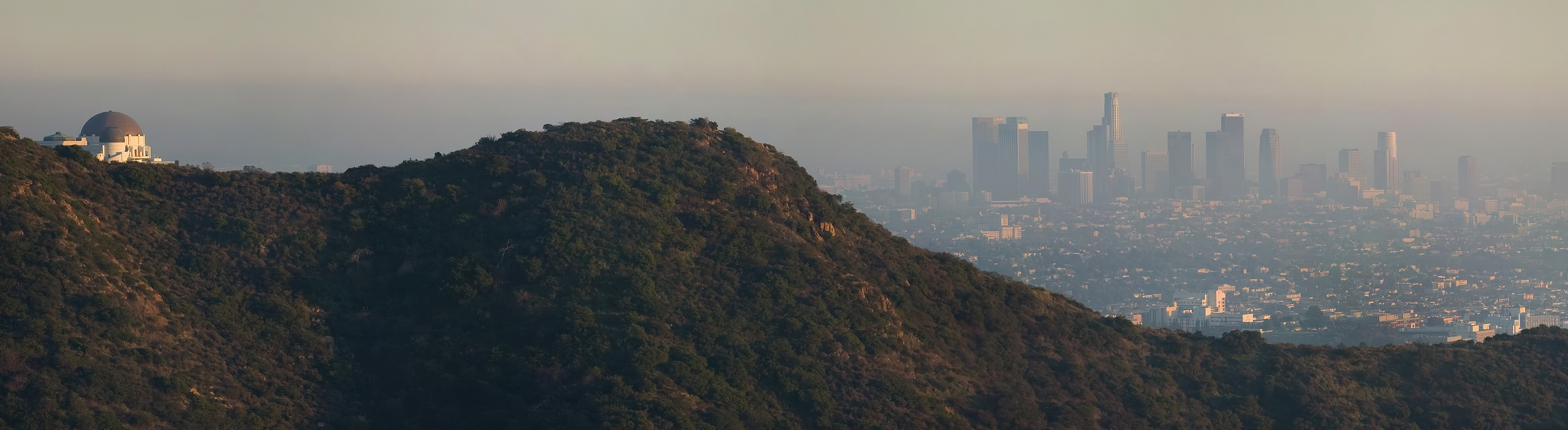
Looking down from the Hollywood Hills, with Griffith Observatory on the hill in the foreground, air pollution is visible in downtown Los Angeles on a late afternoon.

According to the American Lung Association's recent "State of the Air 2017" report, California is a leader in air pollution among other states, with the highest ozone levels. The top three cities in the country with the highest recorded levels of ozone (smog) levels were Los Angeles-Long Beach, Bakersfield, and Fresno-Madera. More than ninety percent of Californians live in counties with unhealthy levels of air quality. A majority of the contaminants that make up air pollution derive from wildfires, industrial facilities, and transportation, most notably human contribution of vehicles.

=== Los Angeles air pollution ===
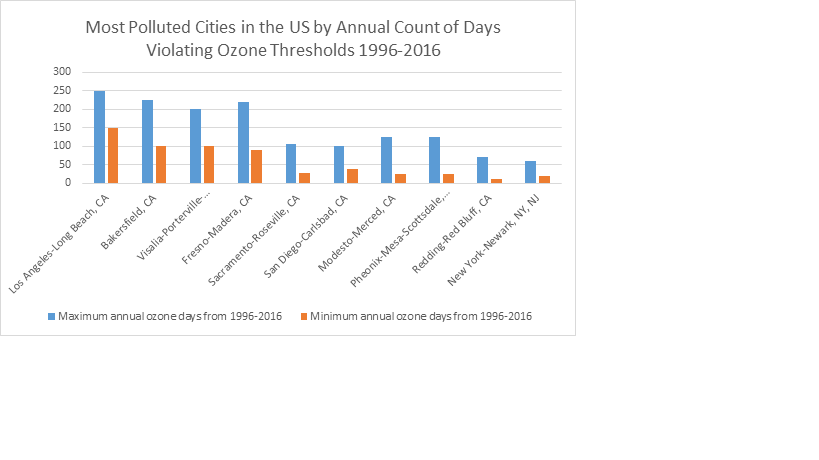
A graph of the top ten most polluted cities in the US

The state of air pollution has been improving in Los Angeles, although it remains the city with the worst ozone pollution. With a population of roughly over 10 million, the Los Angeles area is a large basin with the Pacific Ocean to the west, and several mountain ranges with 11,000-foot peaks (3,400 m) to the east and south, Los Angeles is particularly susceptible to high ozone levels. Diesel engines, ports, motor vehicles, and industries are main sources of air pollution in Los Angeles. Frequent sunny days and low rainfall contribute to ozone formation, as well as high levels of fine particles and dust. The strong relationship between air quality index (AQI) and ozone levels may be found on air pollution maps.

Smog is formed when primary pollutants, usually emitted from vehicles, react with ultraviolet rays to create secondary pollutants. When these primary and secondary pollutants combine, it creates the thick haze that can be seen hovering over the city. While ozone can protect the environment from powerful ultraviolet rays, an overabundance of this ozone can be extremely harmful to the health of people and wildlife. As the city rests in a basin between mountains and an inward-sweeping wind from the Pacific Ocean, the ozone, smog, and other toxic particles stagnate in the middle of the Los Angeles Atmosphere with nowhere to escape. Stagnant atmospheric conditions are fairly typical for Los Angeles atmosphere due to frequent atmospheric inversion (that holds multiple pollutants within over the city in the form of "pollution dome"). The effect of "pollution dome" leads to enhanced concentration of greenhouse gases as well such as methane and carbon dioxide. Researchers have shown that carbon dioxide enhancement in the "dome" over Los Angeles is one of the strongest in the world and it is easily detectable from the satellite observations.

Air pollution in Los Angeles has caused widespread concerns. In 2011, the Public Policy Institute of California (PPIC) Survey on Californians and the Environment showed that 45% of citizens in Los Angeles consider air pollution to be a "big problem", and 47% believe that the air quality of Los Angeles is worse than it was 10 years ago. The most recent PPIC Survey of 2018 showed that the strong majority of California adults (72%) and likely voters favor the new state law mandating reductions in greenhouse gas emissions, and 56% of adults support the state's cap-and-trade program. In addition, about half of Californians believe state climate policies will lead to more jobs, while the other half expects the price of gasoline to rise. In 2013, the Los Angeles-Long Beach-Riverside area ranked as the 1st most ozone-polluted city, the 4th most polluted city by annual particle pollution, and the 4th most polluted city by 24-hour particle pollution.

=== Bay Area air pollution ===
While Los Angeles is by far the leading polluter in the nation, many of the cities in the greater Bay Area often find themselves in the top ten of several pollution charts. Los Angeles's geographical constraints and sprawling layout can be assigned partial blame for their unique pollution circumstances, but the Bay Area is an enormous cluster of large cities that collectively contribute to their own pollution problem. In the State of the Air report, published by the American Lung Association, three of the nine Bay Area counties were listed as receiving failing grades on their pollution scores, namely Alameda, Contra Costa, and Santa Clara. Furthermore, while short-term and year-round particle pollution appeared to slightly improve, ozone levels were made worse from 2014 to 2016. For short-term particle pollution, San Francisco, San Jose, and Oakland ranked sixth in the nation, and the entire Bay Area placed 13th in ozone pollution, which experts say is due to several factors, especially climate change, wildfires, and emissions. The wildfire pollutants are particularly dangerous to the public, as these particles are usually invisible and can have detrimental effects on one's health. When considering the pollution levels in the Bay Area and in most of the Southern half of the state, California has several polluted sites that require the close attention of scientists.

Concerns regarding air pollution locally in Santa Clara County, California were raised after researchers attributed it to California's growth in the data center industry, with increased Artificial intelligence computing. Often a Diesel generator or Backup generator is used by data centers when there are power failures, which means there is an addition of greenhouse gases as well as pollutants locally due to the concentration of these facilities being in Santa Clara County, California, resulting in the localized effects being much greater. It was reported by a reviewed article from 2025 that Particulate matter and Nitrogen oxide pollutants are all associated with cardiovascular and respiratory conditions which are all a result of possible emission from diesel, backup generators, alongside fossil-fueled electricity generators. For example, the CA3 facility that is in Santa Clara, California has 44 diesel generators included, which are capable of supplementing up to 96 MW of power when an emergency might occur, and concerns were raised by the Bay Area Air Quality Management District about cumulative exposure in neighborhoods, which were already being affected by other industrial facilities alongside diesel particulate matter.

There are approximately 20 data centers that are operating within San Jose, California with there also being additional facilities either under review or in construction, regardless of city officials, stating prior that they aren't necessarily aware, if ordinarily individual facilities will be in support of AI workloads, if developers do not disclose that specific information. Staff directed by the city in June 2026 to start the development of uniform standards that address use of water, use of energy, greenhouse, gas, emissions, backup, generators, air, quality, community notifications, and noise. Greater transparency has been requested by local advocates alongside a pause on other approvals while there is a study on the impacts, although city officials on the other hand aren't opposed to a pause partially due to years being taken in order for data center projects to be completed. Some estimates have been disputed by city, representatives of environmental harm, which argue that backup generators are not only tightly regulated, but are also rarely operated within the state of California, while it has been noted by researchers that these states’ structure, pollution, rules, and cleaner or electrical grid both play a role in the reduction of some impacts when being compared with the national average.

A 2008 economic study of the health impacts and associated costs of air pollution in the Los Angeles Basin and San Joaquin Valley of Southern California shows that more than 3,800 people die prematurely (approximately 14 years earlier than normal) each year because air pollution levels violate federal standards. The number of annual premature deaths is considerably higher than the fatalities related to auto collisions in the same area, which average fewer than 2,000 per year.

=== Pollution as an externality ===
In economics, an externality occurs when the producer does not have to pay its full cost, and when it affects another party either positively or negatively. If the cost to society is greater than the cost the consumer is paying for it, then the externality is negative because it imposes this extra cost on society, which can lead to market inefficiencies. Solving the problem of negative externalities can be costly on its own, as it is often difficult to assign responsibility. Typically, the party who owns the property rights to the polluted area is responsible for paying the cost, but alternative strategies include taxing the producer or collecting payments from a determined group of individuals. California suffers specifically from negative production externalities, which is when a firm's production reduces the well-being of others who are not compensated by the firm.

Pollution is one of the most common forms of negative externalities present in the world economy, and this is especially true of California, which suffers from the worst pollution levels in the country. It can also arrive in many forms, such as air pollution, water pollution, farming pollution, and noise pollution. The Market for Air Pollution graph helps visualize how pollution works as a negative externality within California: since the costs for reducing pollution are lower at the market equilibrium, the market will shift to the social equilibrium to reduce the quantity of pollution.

The negative externalities incurred from pollution are numerous, as its broad nature has the capacity to affect masses of people at once. While the health costs are the most obvious, the following sections provide more insight into the negative externalities suffered by the California public.

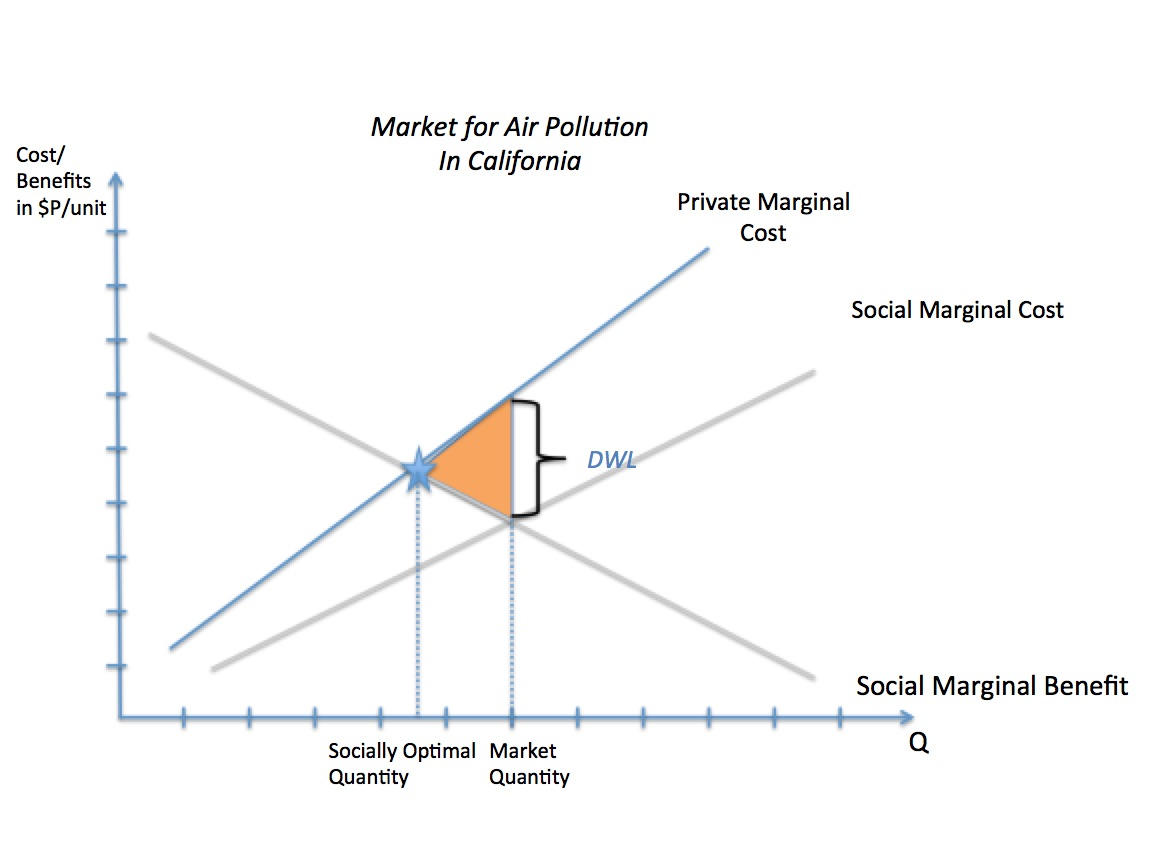
Air pollution in California is a negative externality which arises from the combustion of fossil fuels or other forms of greenhouse gas emissions. As the graphs show, the effects of this negative externality is a deadweight welfare loss (DWL) that results when the marginal benefit does not equal the marginal cost.

There have been studies conducted that point to the possibility of fertilized land being the cause of the vast amounts of smog in suburban areas. Nitrogen, which is present in soil, leaks into the air creating nitrogen oxide in which is a main component of smog. This amount of NO_{x} that is leaked into the air can cause the majority of health issues that are observed in California. These health conditions were described in the introduction and can be detrimental to children and the elderly. Image A below, shows the drastic difference of the amount of nitrogen that is expelled into the air due to fertilizer. Mogenson states that 4% of the state's nitrogen oxide emissions come from soil on agricultural land even though there is not any agricultural land near the hotspots of California's smog studies such as Sacramento and Los Angeles.

== Causes ==
Air pollution stems from a number of sources, and the amount of pollutant from each source differs from place to place. Particulate pollution sources are shown in the graph at right. Residential wood combustion, such as burning wood in fireplaces, is the largest source of PM 2.5 pollution.

Sources of particulate pollution in California.

The Clean Air Act requires the US EPA to regulate six common pollutants. These air pollutants (also known as "criteria pollutants") are found all over the United States. They are particle pollution, ground-level ozone, carbon monoxide, sulfur oxides, nitrogen oxides, and lead. All of these pollutants have been shown to have adverse health and environmental impacts and some can cause property damage. Of the six pollutants, particle pollution and ground-level ozone are the most widespread health threats. EPA calls these pollutants "criteria" air pollutants because it regulates them by developing human health-based and/or environmentally-based criteria (science-based guidelines) for setting permissible levels.

Fossil fuels are a leading source of air and water pollution in the United States. The Clean Air Act estimated the economic cost of air pollution to be $9 trillion between 1970 and 2000. These costs involve pollution-induced health effects and lost productivity. Additionally, global warming is predicted to inflict a variety of other costs, and with declining rainfalls and rising temperatures, global warming can increase the formation of ozone smog and worsen pollution.

Land pollution is principally caused by thoughtless or illegal disposal of wastewaters or solids containing pollutants. Dumping garbage, and littering on the ground, although unsightly, rarely cause much lasting damage unless the material contains non-degradable materials such as many plastics or is at risk of entering a watercourse and thus eventually reaching the sea. Furthermore, a study found that soil emissions, particularly agricultural soils, help contribute a significant amount of nitrogen oxide (NOx for short) to the atmosphere. The study found that biogenic NOx emissions will continue to increase in the coming years as the agriculture sector struggles to meet the increase in food demand, and with the frequent climate changes that are occurring in California every year such as pronounced heat waves and drought, these factors will help exacerbate biogenic NO_{x} emissions.

=== The effects of motor vehicles ===
Motor vehicles are a significant contributor to air pollution. The typical passenger vehicle emits about 4.6 metric tons of carbon dioxide per year. Motor vehicles are mostly powered by fossil fuels and gas which contribute particulate matter, volatile organic compounds, nitrogen oxides, carbon monoxide, sulfur dioxide, and greenhouse gases into the surrounding environment.

=== Industrial facilities ===
Industrial pollution is another leading factor into air pollution where its contributions are particulate matter, sulfur dioxide and nitrogen oxides. They can pollute the air, water, and soil. Some of the industrial facilities include factories, power plants, mining operations, and chemical production facilities. This can cause negative effects on the environment and health.

=== Effects on mortality rate ===
Long-term exposure to particulate air pollution is associated with mortality from heart disease and stroke. Particulate matter < 2.5 μm in diameter (PM2.5) has been associated with multiple mortality categories, especially in the category of cardiovascular death. Combustion-associated pollutants (such as vehicle emissions) have also been linked to the increase in mortality rates. For example, for a 3-day lag, the latter increased by 1.6, 2.1, 1.6, and 1.5% for PM2.5, EC, OC, and nitrates based on interquartile ranges of 14.6, 0.8, 4.6, and 5.5 μg/m3, respectively. An association between mortality and PM2.5 were higher during the cooler months. Affected populations can develop a higher risk for lung cancer and other cardio vascular diseases by breathing in polluted air.

=== Economic effects ===
There are also economic repercussions from the effects of pollution in California. One study suggests the health-related impacts of air pollution in San Joaquin Valley drains the region's economy of $3 billion every year. The study calculates the cost of pollution in Central Valley averages $1,000 per person per year, representing the costs of premature deaths, asthma attacks, acute bronchitis in children, school absences, lost work days, etc.

== Dangers to health ==
Both ozone and particle pollution are dangerous to human health. The Environmental Protection Agency (EPA) engaged a panel of expert scientists, the Clean Air Scientific Advisory Committee, to help them assess the evidence. The EPA released their most recent review of the current research on health threat of ozone and particle pollution.

EPA Concludes Ozone Pollution Poses Serious Health Threats:

- Causes respiratory harm (e.g. worsened asthma, worsened COPD, inflammation)
- Likely to cause early death (both short-term and long-term exposure)
- Likely to cause cardiovascular harm (e.g. heart attacks, strokes, heart disease, congestive heart failure)
- May cause harm to the central nervous system
- May cause reproductive and developmental harm

EPA Concludes Fine Particle Pollution Poses Serious Health Threats:

- Causes early death (both short-term and long-term exposure)
- Causes cardiovascular harm (e.g. heart attacks, strokes, heart disease, congestive heart failure)
- Likely to cause respiratory harm (e.g. worsened asthma, worsened COPD, inflammation)
- May cause cancer
- May cause reproductive and developmental harm

=== Health effects on pregnant women and children ===
Studies have proven there are several negative health outcomes associated with breathing polluted air. Studies have found that some pollutants have damaging effects on humans, especially during pregnancy. More specifically, results from several epidemiological studies suggest that exposure of pregnant women to air pollution results in higher risks of low birth weight in term-born infants. The California Birth Defects Monitoring program measured the amount of carbon monoxide, nitrogen dioxide, ozone, and particulate matter <10 μm in aerodynamic diameter and found that continued exposure to carbon monoxide led to increased cardiac ventricular septal defects, aortic artery and valve defects, pulmonary artery and valve anomalies, and an increase in conotruncal defects. Studies done on humans exposed to pollutants, one of them being polychlorinated biphenyls, which causes decreased birth size, increased sexual development, and altered levels of hormones related to gland regulation. A study conducted by University of California Los Angeles linked ambient air pollution to premature births. The study found that the odds of preterm birth increased consistently with continued or increasing carbon monoxide exposures and exposure to particulate matter less than or equal to 2.5 μm in diameter. The study also found women who were exposed to carbon monoxide above 0.91 ppm during the last 6 weeks of pregnancy experienced and increase in the odds of preterm birth.

Many studies examine the effect of children's health. Some of the findings show that children's lung function growth is adversely affected by air pollution, high levels of air pollution is associated with increased number of asthma cases or asthma exacerbations in children, and school absences from acute respiratory illnesses resulted following rises in ozone levels in student communities. Additionally, numerous problems have been found by the CA Department of Health Services in classrooms at several hundred schools throughout California such as inadequate ventilation, poor thermal comfort, high formaldehyde levels, and toxic residues in floor dust.

=== Health Effects on Vulnerable Populations ===
The Environmental Protection Agency described that children, pregnant women, older adults, and adults with pre existing diseases are more vulnerable to air pollutants. Those neighboring in low socioeconomic neighborhoods are also more susceptible to health effects since they are closer to industrial plants. The Integrated Science Assessments researches and assesses to determine the air quality to protect the public health.

Health effects can range from long inflammation and lung cancer to the vulnerable populations. Pregnant women are susceptible to anxiety and depression due to the effects of air pollution. The elderly are at risk as well as their health is slowly declining and those who have pre-existing conditions being exposed to air pollution can accelerate it.

=== Mental health effects ===
Air pollution can cause many mental effects:

- Depression
- Anxiety
- Loneliness
- Social Isolation
- Physiological Resilience
- Death

=== Ways to Prevent Health Dangers ===
Personal exposure to the air pollution can be reduced by staying indoors on days with levels of high air pollution. Air quality can be checked by using scales that mention moderate, unhealthy, or hazardous air quality conditions. Other ways to avoid the air pollution would be reducing outdoor air infiltration to indoors, cleaning indoor air with air filters, and limiting physical exertion, especially outdoors and near air pollution sources. Avoiding exposure to air pollutants is especially important for susceptible individuals with chronic cardiovascular or pulmonary disease, children, and the elderly. There are also pharmaceutical or chemopreventive interventions such as antioxidants. Many health threats from poor air quality can cause cancer, avoiding the air pollution and taking antioxidants will help improve the health of those who are most affected by poor air quality.

==== Asthma Friendly Outdoor for Children ====
The specific purpose of the Asthma-Friendly Outdoor (Ambient) Air Quality Flag Program was to establish an education and communication tool for Central California communities that would accomplish two things: (1) Establish permanent local policy change to existing operating procedures in school districts and schools to help reduce the exposure of students, teachers, staff, and nearby communities to outdoor environmental asthma triggers and (2) provide education on air quality and potential health effects of exposure to air pollutants. Science-based, simple, visual, low-cost school-based educational interventions to help reduce human exposure to outdoor environmental asthma triggers (i.e., ozone, particles, and pollens) can work in socioeconomically and ethnically diverse urban and rural or agricultural communities, and (2) local health and environmental justice groups such as asthma coalitions can successfully lead school-based environmental interventions to help improve children's quality of life. Programs like these are important for sensitive children who can experience dangers situations in health conditions due to air pollution or poor air quality. It is important for certain kids who are most sensitive to these negative effects of air pollution to be involved in programs like the Asthma Friendly Outdoor program.

=== San Joaquin Valley Air Quality ===
The San Joaquin Valley of California has poor air quality and high rates of asthma. Surveys were collected from 744 residents of the San Joaquin Valley from November 2014 to January 2015 to examine the public's views about air quality. Based on the information gathered, those in the San Joaquin Valley who are exposed to the highest concentrations of a certain air pollutant ranked the air quality in their area much lower compared to other regions who experienced lower concentrations of that air pollutant. The air quality is calculated to be either moderate or unhealthy, especially for sensitive groups such as children, since there is a strong association between poor air quality and asthma. However, there is a great disproportionality when it comes to who experiences the worst of the air quality and who causes it. In 2002 the National Air Toxic Assessment (NATA) identified areas that are at high respiratory risk in the San Joaquin Valley and according to the U.S. Census Bureau, over half of the population in these communities are Hispanic and a quarter lives under the poverty line. Importantly though, these communities also exhibit the highest percentages of residents under 18 years old, who are also some of the most vulnerable to developing respiratory issues. On the contrary, the communities with the lowest risk have a predominantly white middle-class population, with only 38% being Hispanic and 16% living under the poverty line.

As stated before, nitrogen oxide (NO_{x}) is a main cause of the respiratory issues in California and that 4% of NO_{x} comes from agricultural land alone. The San Joaquin Valley is one of California's top ten producers of agriculture and this sector of the economy makes up the majority of jobs in the Valley. Consequently, agriculture contributes to 35% of the Valley's air pollution making it the largest contributor compared to other contributors such as cars and trucks, forest fires, etc. However, it was not until 2004 that farms in California were required to meet the same permit requirements as other industries in terms of air pollution.

== Government intervention ==
Helping California meet the national air quality standards and improve the health of local residents continues to be a priority for the EPA. One of EPA's highest priorities is to support the reduction of diesel emissions from ships, trucks, locomotives, and other diesel engines. In 2005, Congress authorized funding for the Diesel Emissions Reduction Act (DERA), a grant program, administrated by the EPA, to selectively retrofit or replace the older diesel engines most likely to impact human health. Since 2008, the DERA program has achieved impressive outcome of improving air quality. The EPA also works with state and local partners to decrease emissions from port operations and to improve the efficient transportation of goods through the region. Together with the Port of Long Beach the EPA and the Port of Los Angeles are partners of the San Pedro Bay Ports Clean Air Action Plan, a sweeping plan aimed at significantly reducing the health risks posed by air pollution from port-related ships, trains, trucks, terminal equipment and harbor craft. These two ports are the busiest container ports in the United States. For environmental justice, air pollution in low-income LA communities has received more attention. In 2011, the "Clean up Green up" campaign was launched to designate three low-income LA communities: Pacoima, Boyle Heights and Wilmington. This campaign aims to push green industries through incentives, including help obtaining permits and tax and utility rebates. Although Los Angeles air pollution level has declined for the last few decades, citizens in Los Angeles still suffer from high level air pollution.

Additionally, in efforts to shift away from the practice of agriculture burning, the act of burning crop fields as a means of managing vegetation, diseases, weeds, etc. which contributes to air pollution, the California State Legislature passed a Bill to completely phase out this agricultural practice between 2005 and 2010. However, the California Air Resources Board (CARB) and San Joaquin Valley Air Control District have been postponing the prohibition to burn for certain crops and materials and it was only until recently, June 2021, that they reported that by January 2025 there will be little to no use of agricultural burning throughout San Joaquin Valley. Furthermore, California Legislature recently subsidized the shift away from agricultural burning by providing $180 million to CARB and the San Joaquin Valley Air Control District to support their transition in finding alternatives.

=== Tailpipe pollution ===
With the modern world and the industrial expansion of gasoline and diesel-powered vehicles, tailpipe emissions continue to be vital contributors to air pollution. Each vehicle that has the capability of burning fossil fuels emits some sort of harmful substances, or exhaust gases, into the air every minute that they are running. Three of the most common gasses produced by vehicles include hydrocarbons, carbon monoxides and nitrogen oxides. However different in some ways, the formation of these gases within the engine all adhere to a single basic factor which happens to be the combustion of fuel and air. Combustion in no case is ever a perfect chemical reaction. In every combustion process there is either extra fuel or not enough fuel; therefore, creating and emitting unwanted gases.

Firstly, there is hydrocarbons which is the most common and a very abundant pollutant of vehicles. Hydrocarbons are the products of fuel that have not burnt through the process of combustion. In some cases of combustion, fuel remains a raw vapor as it exits the tailpipe of the vehicle. These particles of raw gasoline vapor, or hydrocarbons, go through the entirety of the combustion process without taking part in the process and manages to escape into the air we breathe. Along with raw fuel, there are other factors to vehicles emitting hydrocarbons as well. For example, in a vehicle, the fuel system is pressurized. This is because gasoline is highly volatile and any small leak can mean that the gas vapors, or hydrocarbons, will escape into the air. These small leaks can be anywhere within the entire "Evaporative Emission Control System," or the system that houses and delivers the fuel to the engine. Any cracks in fuel lines or ventilation hoses along with even worn or loose gas caps will cause raw gasoline particle to escape into the air, polluting it with hydrocarbons.

There is also the issue of the combustion taking place with a concentration that is too fuel rich. In this case, we find that there is the formation of carbon monoxides. Carbon monoxide is formed in the combustion process when there is the combustion of fuel with insufficient amounts of oxygen, preventing the formation of the normal carbon dioxide and therefore ends up forming carbon monoxide molecules, which can possibly be fatal to humans.

Another harmful substance that results from the combustion process is nitrogen oxide. Nitrogen oxide is formed not as a deformity, but rather is a result of the different compositions of air. Air is composed of two main elements: nitrogen and oxygen. Therefore, as the engine intakes the surround atmospheric air for the combustion process, nitrogen happens to be one of the elements being sucked in. In the cases of regular ambient temperatures, the two gases nitrogen and oxygen are not chemically reactive with each other, yet when they are together inside the cylinder of an engine while combustion processes are occurring, they become reactive. These high temperatures inside the cylinders cause the nitrogen and oxygen atoms to bond creating the substance nitrogen oxide which is then emitted into the air through the tailpipe of the vehicle.

==== Effects of tailpipe emissions ====
On average, each vehicle emits about 250 pounds of carbon monoxides, 18.32 pounds of nitrogen oxides, 29 pounds of hydro-carbons and 9,737 pounds of carbon dioxide every year. These gases emitted by vehicles are harmful to humans both directly and indirectly. The biggest and most widely known issue caused by vehicles is due to the carbon dioxide they produce. Carbon dioxide is known as a greenhouse gas because they ascend into the atmosphere and act as a blanket within our atmosphere causing the "Greenhouse effect". The "Greenhouse Effect" is a global phenomenon that is causing rises and temperatures and sea level. While the carbon dioxide continues to trap heat inside the atmosphere. With the rise of carbon dioxide gases in our atmosphere worldwide, transportation poses as one of the highest contributors to air pollution. According to the EPA, transportation produces around 29% of the Greenhouse Gas emissions worldwide.

Tailpipe emissions also pose a more direct harm to humans. The majority of the gases being emitted by the tailpipe of a vehicle can lead to numerous complications and health issues. Excess ingestion of any of the gases will sever oxygen delivery to ones organs, and can lead to serious issues such as breathing and heart problems. Mass intakes of these gases will begin damaging organs within a human body immediately, disabling a person's breathing capability. High doses of these gases can also contribute to heightened levels of allergic reactions, irritations, bronchitis and even pneumonia. Yet, even if large amounts of these gases are not ingested at once, small doses of these gases can lead to numerous long term detriments as well. Continuous small doses of these gases can lead to the deterioration of one's lungs and even contribute to future heart diseases.

==== Vehicle emissions regulatory efforts ====
In response to the emissions effects, California has taken the initiative to put in place multiple programs and organizations to help regulate tailpipe emissions from vehicles. Two of the largest governmental organizations instituted in California to reduce emissions effects include: California's Air Resources Board (CARB) and the Bureau of Automotive Repair (BAR). Each of these organizations take continuous efforts to revise the laws to ensure that vehicles that are being driven on the streets are not over polluting the environment that we live in. CARB and BAR cooperatively instate multiple regulations pertaining to the emissions components on cars which are California specific. Due to these efforts, California is widely known as one of the most regulated states when adhering to tailpipe emissions. In order to legally operate a vehicle in California, most vehicles must be CARB compliant as well as pass the biennial smog test.

The Smog Check program is one that has been instituted in most of the states throughout the United States, however, in California, the program proves to be one of the most stringent tests. The test is not stringent due to the nature of the testing procedure, but rather the emissions cut-points and defining of legal parts that California enforces. California goes about implementing different smog guidelines for different vehicle model years. For instance, according to the DMV website, vehicles of the model year 1975 and older are all smog exempt and do not need to go through the process of getting a smog inspection in California. It may be true that these older cars in actuality emit more pollutants than its newer counterparts, but from a cost effectiveness standpoint there simply aren't enough cars that are 1975 and older to implement smog tests on these vehicles. On the other hand, however, vehicles ranging from 1976 to 1996 have a multi-part smog inspection which needs to be completed once every two years. This test consists of the following: tailpipe emissions test, a visual inspection, an evaporative emissions system pressure test and a check to ensure ignition timing (on applicable vehicles). Each one of these components of the test are essential to keep a vehicle from over-polluting into the environment. The evaporative emissions system test, for example, would determine that the system is pressure tested and secured with no leaks so that excess hydrocarbons are not being emitted into the atmosphere. While on the other hand, the tailpipe emissions test directly measures the amount of pollutants that the vehicle emits. The State of California has set rigorous tailpipe emissions cut points for each vehicle that then determines whether it will pass or fail the emissions test. These cut-points are set for the amounts of hydrocarbons, carbon-monoxides, nitrogen oxides and percent carbon dioxide that a vehicle is permitted to emit before it is considered to be over-polluting. The Bureau of Automotive Repair and California's Air Resources Board conducts multiple tests throughout the year to gather enough sample data to set reasonable values for the cut-points for each vehicle within California. In doing so, the state's two main concerns are to limit air pollution, and prevent excess consumer failure rates. Therefore, through their roadside smog tests and emissions surveys California manages to maintain cut-points that reflect reasonable values.

Another major factor within the smog check program is the visual test. The visual test is important, especially in California because it ensures that vehicle emissions components are not damaged or tampered with. BAR and CARB have continuously implemented strict aftermarket or tampered parts guidelines specific to each vehicle make and model. Every vehicle registered in California must be equipped with either original equipment from the manufacturer or if it does contain any aftermarket emissions-related parts it must have an executive order approved by CARB. These executive orders ensure that the aftermarket part that is being installed on the vehicle will not increase the emissions of the vehicle. CARB has an extensive database of the parts that are legal to use within California and any vehicle equipped with these parts must also be equipped with a sticker or badge that indicates the executive order number of the part.

Most states will allow a vehicle to pass its smog inspection even when equipped with non-CARB approved parts installed on the vehicle, as long as the vehicle is still functioning properly. In terms of proper functionality, these states examine the vehicle check engine light and in some cases conduct a two-speed idle test in which vehicle emissions are examined at a standstill state of the vehicle. However, in California even if the vehicle is so-called "functioning properly" it will not pass smog if any emissions components are not equipped with an executive order number. The state of California enforces this because the state's set emissions cut-points are held at much higher standards than most other states. Therefore, if a part is not CARB approved there is a high chance that it leads to more than ideal emissions particles being emitted by the vehicle. By adhering to CARB legal parts, consumers are helping reduce the pollution effects of their vehicles on the Earth.

==== Reformation efforts ====
Despite the state's efforts to reduce air pollution, tailpipe pollution continued to increase as of January 2019, increasing 5% since 2013. The government of California has set a target goal of 5 million electric vehicles by 2030, but even if California is successful in meeting this goal, they won't meet their carbon reduction goal without at least a 25% reduction in per capita miles travels. Because of the layout of California's sprawling cities, the state is not well suited for public transportation and this continues to affect California's ability to meet its targets for carbon reduction.

Greenhouse gas emissions are a grave danger to Californians, as the presence of these pollutants is already felt throughout the state and is difficult to combat due to the massive number of cars being driven daily. As mentioned, Los Angeles is especially vulnerable to this issue because commute by vehicle is the principal form of transportation in the city, so the emissions from cars will only continue to fill the thick, stagnant air until better solutions are implemented. As of now, two of these goals are to reduce emissions by 40% by the year 2030, and to continue searching for renewable resources, such as electricity. While ambitious, these goals are working toward a crucial goal: reduce emissions by removing a portion of the source of the problem.

== Wildfires ==
Air pollution due to the aforementioned sources serve to exacerbate the effects of climate change, which causes forest fire activity to increase as the climate along the west coast of the United States becomes hotter and drier. A 2016 study concluded that fuel aridity, which indicates how favorable forest vegetation is towards igniting and starting fires, increased significantly over the years 1979–2015, and that dry, hot, fire-weather seasons increased on average by 41% over this same time frame. The study also concluded that about 55% of the increase in both fuel aridity and the length of fire seasons on the west coast was due to human activity alone. As forests burn, they also release greenhouse gases into the atmosphere, continuing to reinforce climate change and local warming in a positive feedback loop, as well as directly causing health problems to people living nearby that may breathe the smoke. During the summer of 2021, significant amounts of land were reported to be burned, which included a fire that spanned nearly a million acres—the largest in California's history. This was a contributor to the 75 million metric tons of CO_{2} released by wildfires from June to August 2021, according to the Copernicus Atmospheric Monitoring Service. Wildfires specifically are one of the main sources of fine particulate matter smaller than 2.5 mm in diameter (PM_{2.5}), and it is projected that by 2051 there will be 1.6 times more PM2.5 in the air over the west coast due to wildfires compared to today, with smoke levels being significantly higher in sections of Central to Northern California during fire seasons.

On an economic level, damages from wildfires can have significant socioeconomic costs, both on a direct and indirect level. A study analyzing the economic impact of the 2018 California wildfires found that almost 150 billion dollars were spent on wildfire damages (about 1.5% of its annual GDP), 59% of which consisted of indirect losses (i.e. disrupted supply chains) both in- and out-of-state. Preventative expenditures are also costly, and among all western states California has the highest wildfire suppression costs by far, totaling over $890 million between 2005 and 2015. Concern for the state's increased susceptibility to wildfires has also increasingly led to a push for legislatures regarding wildfire prevention and mitigation funding.

In 2020, California recorded the top 5 largest wildfires that burned more than 1.7 million hectares of land. The effects caused displacements of many homes and a large amount of debris. In Northern California, fires were initiated through lightning caused by storms that occurred on August 16–17, and progressively increased in size, thus becoming wildfires. The California Governor Gavin Newsom stated during this time there was 367 known fires that were active due to Santa Ana winds and the heat wave. Some of the most notable fires are August Complex fire, SCU Lightning Complex, Creek Fire, LNU Lightning Complex, and CZU Lightning Complex. For example, in 2021 Initiative Statue 21-0037 was proposed, which allocates funds towards training firefighters, strengthening wildfire monitoring systems, and improving infrastructure in areas that are vulnerable to fire.

== Air pollution and environmental injustice ==
The U.S. Environmental Protection Agency's interactive online map - EJSCREEN - features the low socioeconomic communities across the country that are more vulnerable to air pollution and its associated health risks. As exhibited in this map, Southeast Los Angeles County neighborhoods, primarily impoverished areas in the San Joaquin Valley and Inland Empire, face a higher exposure to air pollution and environmental injustices. In such areas, those in poverty-stricken areas have unequal access to environmental health and safety resources. These poverty-stricken neighborhoods are frequently located in areas that are near freeways, hazardous facilities, and/or rail yards.

=== Instances of environmental injustice ===
Due to air pollution, studies show there is a higher percentage of health effects that have occurred because of high concentration of air pollution. There is a new effect due to air pollution of premature death occurring and respiratory and cardiovascular health. Californians have suffered 18,000 premature deaths and more than 10,000 illness across the year. Communities in Los Angeles have been projected to have the highest concentration of air pollution and people of color are most susceptible to this. Low-income communities are begin affected through not being able to afford air filtration systems or their wage isn't able to cover this. Many of the low-income experience heat island effects because they are in the most inner part of Los Angeles. Which increases the temperature they feel and traps the pollution towards the center of Los Angeles. With the increasing changes in the environment, low-income families find it difficult to afford insurance. Low-income groups and people of color tend to live by freeways and traffic prone streets because of the affordable housing. This imposes a risk of displacement for many communities that can't afford their necessities and with the rising climate change. It could be cause a concern for government elects and environmental policies.

In low-income neighborhoods many have limited access to cooling agents and live in segregated neighborhoods in Los Angeles. In occurrences of heat waves minorities often face hospitalization in cardiovascular complications, respiratory diseases, and heat strokes. This involves 65% of state's population that experience health hazards due to extreme temperatures and weather.

==== Diabetes in Los Angeles County Latino children ====
In 2017, researchers found that diabetes in Latino and Latina children living in Los Angeles is linked to air quality. A study led by the University of Southern California was the first of its kind to follow the health and residential air pollution levels of the same children over a span of several years. The subjects of the study were overweight Latino children, between the ages of eight and fifteen, residing in areas with excess particulate matter. In particular, the neighborhoods of the children were located in areas of elevated nitrogen dioxide levels, an air pollutant caused nearby power plants and high-volume vehicle traffic. The results demonstrated that the children possessed significantly increased risk factors for Type 2 diabetes by the time they turned eighteen, such as diminished efficiency in the insulin-secreting cells of the pancreas. The insulin resistance that results from such a condition is a direct cause of diabetes onset.

Diabetes mellitus is a disease that is characterized by the body's inability to properly regulate blood glucose (or blood sugar) levels. Prolonged levels of high blood sugar may lead to severe health complications such as heart disease, nerve damage, kidney failure, blindness, or even early death. As diabetes becomes a rising epidemic, the Center for Disease Control and Prevention estimates that up to nearly 8 million U.S. citizens may have undiagnosed diabetes or its precursor. Conventional medical findings suggest that unhealthy or calorie-dense diets, lack of physical activity, and family history are risk factors for developing the disease; however, recent studies are beginning to trace a connection between Type 2 diabetes and the external factor of air pollution. Because socioeconomic status, race, and exposure to air pollution are frequently correlated, the CDC acknowledges certain socioeconomic conditions or races as pre-existing risk factors for Type 2 diabetes, in addition to those previously listed. Statistics suggest that Hispanic people are 50% more likely to die from diabetes than whites, and studies focusing on issues of environmental injustice are able to demonstrate possible reasons for this disparity.

==== The Port of Long Beach and Construction of Interstate 710 in Long Beach ====
The area surrounding the Port of Long Beach and the Interstate 710 (I-710) freeway has been identified as a site of significant air pollution and environmental health disparities. The Port of Long Beach is the second busiest port in the United States and generates high volumes of truck and freight traffic along the I-710. The concentration of diesel emissions in the area has contributed to elevated levels of air pollutants such as particulate matter (PM2.5) and nitrogen oxides (NOx), which have been linked to increased rates of asthma, cardiovascular disease, and other health conditions in nearby communities. These neighborhoods are primarily composed of low-income and Latino residents which have raised concerns about the disproportionate burden of environmental risks.

Historical infrastructure planning involving the construction of the I-710 has lacked community consultation and has been shown to disproportionately impact vulnerable populations, particularly during the planning stages of major transportation projects. The plan to expand the I-710 was formally initiated in 1999 when the California Department of Transportation (Caltrans) identified the need for improvements along the corridor from Route 1 in Long Beach to Interstate 210 in Pasadena. This initiative aimed to upgrade the freeway to meet current federal standards and accommodate projected traffic demands. In 2018, the Los Angeles County Metropolitan Transportation Authority (Metro) approved a $6 billion expansion plan, which included adding new auxiliary lanes in Long Beach. However, in 2022, Metro unanimously voted to end the expansion plans due to concerns over environmental impacts and community opposition. Community members, advocacy groups, and residents have criticized the environmental review process for failing to incorporate public health data and local concerns about air quality impacts. Research indicates that the planning process did not sufficiently assess cumulative environmental burdens already experienced by these neighborhoods, nor did it provide comprehensive mitigation strategies. As a result, the project has been viewed by many as a continuation of past patterns in which low-income and minority communities are disproportionately affected by pollution-intensive infrastructure.

==== Proximity of schools to vehicle traffic in Culver City ====
The spatial arrangement of Californian communities plays a large role in determining exposure to the concentrated air pollution of the state's southern regions. In one suburb of Los Angeles, El Marino Language School sits adjacent to the ten-lane Interstate 405. Students of schools like these, often elementary-aged, are subject to dramatically increased levels of pollution from automobile emissions, including carcinogenic compounds. Health effects of traffic pollution include the onset of cardiovascular disease, asthma, impaired lung function, premature death, and a plethora of other complications. Furthermore, the incomplete development of children's sensitive respiratory systems leads to compounded effects of air pollution when compared with the health effects of the same pollution on adults.

Though the health consequences of vehicle pollution are widely recognized and some legislation has been enacted to reduce its impact, very little tangible action has actually been taken. In 2003, California passed Senate Bill No. 352, which banned the construction of new schools within 500 feet of freeways with certain exceptions. However, the bill remained largely ignored as 1 in 5 schools opened between 2014 and 2015 were still in direct violation of the ban. In 2015, the Environmental Protection Agency released a report titled "Best Practices for Reducing Near-Road Pollution Exposure at Schools", available both online and in-print. However, without any requirements regarding school siting from the U.S. Department of Education, state-funded schools are under no obligation to follow its guidelines. The reluctance of public schools to comply with safety regulations often stems from monetary limitations that encourage the use of cheap land, a dilemma that disproportionately impacts children of poorer areas; the report noted that minority and low-income students have a higher prevalence of attendance in public schools of urban areas, such as the big cities in which busy roads and schools share territory.

==== Fracking violations in Kern County school zones ====
Oil fracking is a process that involves a high-pressure injection of fluid into the ground to extract oil. The adverse environmental effects of this oil and natural gas extraction are the subject of much controversy, the primary concerns of which surround the contamination of surrounding water and air sources. These risks result when underground drinking water and surface water are exposed to discharges of the chemically infused fracking fluid due to faulty construction or operation, disposal leaks, or other unintended byproducts like the release of hazardous volatile compounds into the air. In terms of air pollution, "hydrofracking" causes detriment to both the environment and human health. Enormous quantities of methane, a greenhouse gas, escape into the ozone layer of Earth's atmosphere during the extraction process, where they accelerate the impacts of climate change. Furthermore, air contaminants like nitrogen oxides, carbon monoxide, formaldehydes, and hydrogen sulfide that are released during drilling have been shown to cause harmful effects ranging from cancer, organ failure, neurological issues, to birth defects.

In 2015, a study revealed that there are forty-five fracking sites within 1.5 miles of one junior high in the town of Shafter, one of California's top ten most polluted communities. The students of this community suffer from the state's decision to allow oil companies to continue hydraulic fracturing within close proximity of their schools. Parents observe severe and unexplainable health complications amongst their children, including asthma and epilepsy, that may be correlated with air toxins from the nearby wells. In all of Kern County, in which Shafter is located, a staggering ten school districts sit within one mile of fracking wells. The situation becomes even more problematic when the fact that Kern County is predominantly Latino in racial/ethnic composition is considered; in fact, 20% or more of its residents are foreign-born emigrants of Asia and Latin America. Some argue that the concentration of fracking sites around the community's population of color is a discriminatory practice in direct violation of California Code 11135, which states that no person shall be unlawfully subjected to discrimination by any state or state-funded agency on the basis of race or ethnic group identification.

==== Inequalities in cumulative environmental burdens among three urbanized counties ====
In 2012, this research used the method of cumulative environmental hazard inequality Index (CEHII), which is a model developed to environmental inequality in air pollution hazards., to analyze the environmental inequality in three counties in California: Alameda, San Diego and Los Angeles (Jason et al. 2012). In addition to frequently used air pollution parameter like NO_{2}, PM 2.5 and diesel PM, a metric of heat stress was included for the analysis because excessive heat weather comes to be an environmental problem that can threaten human health.

The result indicated that colored communities bear greater air pollution including NO_{2}, PM 2.5, PM 10, and heat stress compared to predominantly white and more affluent communities. In San Diego County, the relative heat stress inequality was founded to be the highest. Also, significant heat stress inequality was observed in Los Angeles. The result shows that in these two counties, there was a strong positive correlation between the percentage of Non-Whites in the community and heat stress inequality. However, in Alameda county, an opposite pattern was found: the community with a higher White population experienced more extreme temperature exceedances. This might be explained by the fact that the White population and the more affluent class in Alameda County mainly lived in the eastern area further away from the coast, which resulted in the higher heat stress exposure.

Also, the research verified that poverty status is consistent with the trend of disproportion burden of the racial-ethnic status. As the analysis was conducted according to the poverty status instead of racial-ethnic status for air pollutants NO_{2}, PM2.5, and diesel PM, the results indicated a similar result as the analysis to heat stress. Furthermore, from the data, a strong correlation was found between poverty and proportion of non-white population (Alameda: r=0.69, Los Angeles: r=0.77). Above all, this research demonstrates that air pollution is disproportionately distributed according to the socioeconomic and racial-ethnic status in the United States.

As a future direction of study, it plans to classify the inequality that exists in African American, Hispanic, Asian, and other ethnic groups. Furthermore, the technique used in this research provided a way to assess environmental inequality and the results can be used to assist decision makers in efforts to address environmental inequality issues.

==== Proposed coal terminal in West Oakland ====
In February 2016, the city of Oakland publicly announced construction plans for the Oakland Bulk and Oversized Terminal, a bulk exporting facility in West Oakland. As a predominantly Latino and African-American community, the residents of West Oakland live in a community that suffers from dangerous levels of air pollution. The construction of this port and its proposed partnership with Utah's coal-mining counties would rank the city as the lead coal exporter on the West Coast. To fund such a goliath project in the face of strong resistance from city councils fighting to protect their local communities from drastically increasing pollution emissions, Utah state and county officials arranged a controversial $53 million loan. The fund, composed of taxpayer dollars intended for local projects, would allow for the annual shipping of 9 million tons of coal through Oakland and an increase in national coal exports by 19%. A movement by environmental advocates quickly grew, citing that exposure to toxic coal dust would also subject the city's residents to increased risks of bronchitis, pneumonia, heart disease, emphysema, and more.

In response, thousands of Oakland residents and environmental rights activists worked together to prevent the construction of the coal terminal at the former Oakland Army Base. In July 2016, Oakland City Council voted to ban coal from being handled and stored in the City of Oakland. The decision marked a large victory for the newly established Department of Race and Equity, an organization designed to protect Oakland's predominantly African-American community from social and racial disparities. According to the "Toxic Wastes and Race in the United States" report issued by the East Bay Community Foundation, those living in West Oakland already encounter five times more toxic pollution per person than residents of the city of Oakland, and children living in West Oakland are seven times more likely to be hospitalized for asthma than the average child in California. The residents of West Oakland are more likely to face both decreased life expectancy and asthma-related emergency room visits. For a city already bearing a disproportionate amount of environmental burdens, the fight for a coal-free Oakland was a success for proponents of environmental justice.

== Water pollution ==
=== Gold Rush era ===
The Gold Rush of California left a long-lasting mark of pollution in the River systems of California. Northern California Gold mine runoff largely contributes to the elevated levels of mercury found in the river systems, such as, the Sacramento River. The mining of mercury along coastal ranges and its use in processing gold in the Sierra Nevada area is the reason for increased levels of this heavy metal. As mercury travels down the California River system it gets deposited along the river and buried under or with other sediment. Due to the burying of this heavy metal, increases in mercury in the actual river water can be seen during peak storm flow when the water is capable of holding more sediment due to its increased capacity and speed. The mercury gets unburied and reintroduced into the flow of the river water. One of the problems that arise from having mercury in the California river system is bio accumulation. As fish are exposed to mercury in the river system it begins to accumulate in their tissues. When another organism eats a contaminated fish, they ingest the mercury that was in the fish, which then accumulates in their tissues. This causes a risk to human health as fisherman or hunters catch these fish, or predators of these fish, which then passes the mercury on to the human consumers.

=== Early 1900s ===
Before true water quality regulations began in the 1960s and 70's, California largely dumped their waste, such as, raw sewage, into bodies of water legally. Billions of gallons of sewage, treatable waste water and storm drain water were dumped into California streams around the 1940s. It was not until around 1945 that the problem of water pollution in California began to be truly noticed. 13 water wells tested positive for phenolic waste in the Montebello District. The beginning attempts at water regulations began at this point, especially when it was realized that this quality of water was not an isolated incident rather it was common across the entire state.

=== Leaded gasoline ===
The use of leaded gasoline up until 1992, when it was phased out, caused a large amount of lead to be introduced into the California water systems. 90% of the lead emitted in California is from leaded gasoline which is higher than the total global emissions from leaded gasoline. The reason it is greater in California is due to the high use of cars in California. The amount of lead in the water system is similar to mercury in that its concentration in the water increases during peak flows. The overall amount of lead recorded in the California water system has been declining over the past few decades.

=== Increased NH_{4}^{+} ===
California waste water treatment plants release large amounts of N (Nitrogen) in the form of NH_{4}^{+} (Ammonium). This has been shown to reduce naturally occurring spring and summer phytoplankton blooms. These creatures make up the primary source of food. With the lack of dependable Phytoplankton blooms a bottom-up effect occurs. Decreased biodiversity and overall number of species located in the water of California over time can be seen due to the large amounts of NH_{4}^{+}. The main source of this NH_{4}^{+} can be traced to the Sacramento Regional Water Treatment Plant (SRWTP). SRWTP releases 90% of the NH_{4}^{+} seen in the San Francisco Estuary (SFE)

=== Regulation ===
Water quality regulations started in the 1960s and 1970s with the passage of the California's Porter-Cologne Water Quality Control Act and the federal Clean Water and Safe Drinking Water Acts, which prevent discharges of pollution into water bodies and control the quality of water that comes out of the tap. Pollution in water systems occurs when toxic substances enter water systems such as lakes, rivers, and oceans and cause degradation.

California is faced with several water pollution issues that are unique to the state. For example, it has suffered a severe drought for many years, and researchers claim this could be a major reason for the poor water quality observed in many parts of California today. The heat and low flows of water lead to stagnant, toxic bodies of water that are warm in temperature and low in oxygen. Along with an increase in salinity in the water, these complications pose a serious threat to the marine life. However, the issue of water pollution in California is not limited to rivers and the ocean. Some counties are notorious for having toxic chemicals found in their water supply. Many counties use groundwater reserves as drinking water, which is often filled with toxins, such as nitrate. This problem is a particular hazard in the San Joaquin Valley, where 63% of California's nitrate-infested water supplies reside. Arsenic, uranium, and fluoride are also commonly found in Californian wells, posing a direct threat to public health. One reporter even recalled a story in which he stopped on the side of the road to examine the foul-smelling pools of water that were steaming from the oil toxicity. In 2015, an oil spill occurred off the coast of Santa Barbara, sending 105,000 gallons of crude oil into the Pacific Ocean and killing thousands of animals and surrounding wildlife. The Santa Barbara oil spill of 1969 caused 3 million gallons of oil to spill into the ocean. This was the largest oil spill in United States history for many years and gained national attention as images of dead animals washing ashore flooded the media.

=== Ocean litter ===
The issue of ocean pollution does not only affect California's Pacific coast, it is an international issue. According to the National Oceanic and Atmospheric Administration, there is no place on Earth that has been left untouched by marine debris. Marine debris is anything man-made that ends up in marine environments. Some of the most common items that end up as debris are plastics, abandoned vessels, and fishing gear. Of the marine debris, approximately 80% originates from land, the other percentage comes from sea disposal. The North Pacific Subtropical Gyre (NPSG) commonly referred to as the 'Great Pacific Garbage Patch' is a result of the marine debris accumulating.

While access to plastic has increased the amount of plastic in marine environments reciprocates. These plastic products in marine environments degrade slowly, remaining floating for an extended amount of time or sink to the bottom where they can remain for up to several decades. The threats posed by the plastic in the ocean and other bodies if water includes animals becoming entangled leading to drowning, ingestion which can lead to digestive and feeding issues. The issue of ocean pollution affects marine wildlife, human health and California's tourist economy. The litter other than becoming an eyesore to California's beaches can also negatively affect coastal communities economy.

==== The Ocean Cleanup ====
To help combat the plastic flowing into the Pacific Ocean, The Ocean Cleanup organization announced they would deploy an Interceptor Original, one of their solar-powered, automated systems, near the mouth of the Ballona Creek in southwestern Los Angeles County in 2022.

== See also ==
- Central Valley groundwater pollution
- Climate change in California
- Environmental impact of shipping
- Pollution in Long Beach, California

Government response:

- California Air Resources Board
- California Environmental Protection Agency
- Global Warming Solutions Act of 2006
- List of Superfund sites in California
