= Stewardship council =

Stewardship council may refer to:

- Delta Stewardship Council (since 2010), charged with creating a development plan for the Sacramento-San Joaquin River Delta, California, U.S.
- Forest Stewardship Council (since 1993), a non-profit organization which promotes responsible forest management
- Marine Stewardship Council (since 1996), a non-profit organization which sets sustainable fishing standards
- Aquaculture Stewardship Council (since 2010), a non-profit organization which promotes sustainable aquaculture

== See also ==
- Stewardship
