= San Francisco Estuary and Watershed Science =

- Discipline: Earth and atmospheric sciences
- Language: English

Standard abbreviations
- ISO 4: San Franc. Estuary Watershed Sci.

Indexing
- ISSN: 1546-2366

Links
- Journal homepage

San Francisco Estuary and Watershed Science is a quarterly peer-reviewed open access scientific journal published by the California Digital Library covering research about the science and resource management of the San Francisco Bay, the Sacramento–San Joaquin River Delta, and the upstream watersheds. The journal was established in October 2003 and receives administrative and financial support from the John Muir Institute of the Environment (University of California, Davis) and the Delta Stewardship Council. The editor-in-chief is Samuel N. Luoma (University of California, Davis).

== Abstracting and indexing ==
The journal is abstracted and indexed in Scopus and The Zoological Record.

== See also ==
- Ecology of the San Francisco Estuary
