= Berryessa Highlands, California =

Unincorporated community in California, United States

Berryessa Highlands
- unincorporated community
- Location in California Berryessa Highlands (the United States)
- Coordinates: 38°30′43″N 122°11′33″W
- Country: United States
- State: California
- County: Napa

Berryessa Highlands is an unincorporated community in Napa County, California, United States. It lies on the southeastern shore of Lake Berryessa. The Berryessa Highlands Development Company developed much of the community, and in 1981 still owned approximately 125 lots in the subdivision. It is surrounded by the Blue Ridge Berryessa Natural Area and Putah Creek State Wildlife Area is to the east.

In August 2020, the community was evacuated due to the Hennessey Fire. The fire resulted in the destruction and damage of many homes in Berryessa Highlands.
