= August 2020 California lightning wildfires =

Natural disaster in the United States

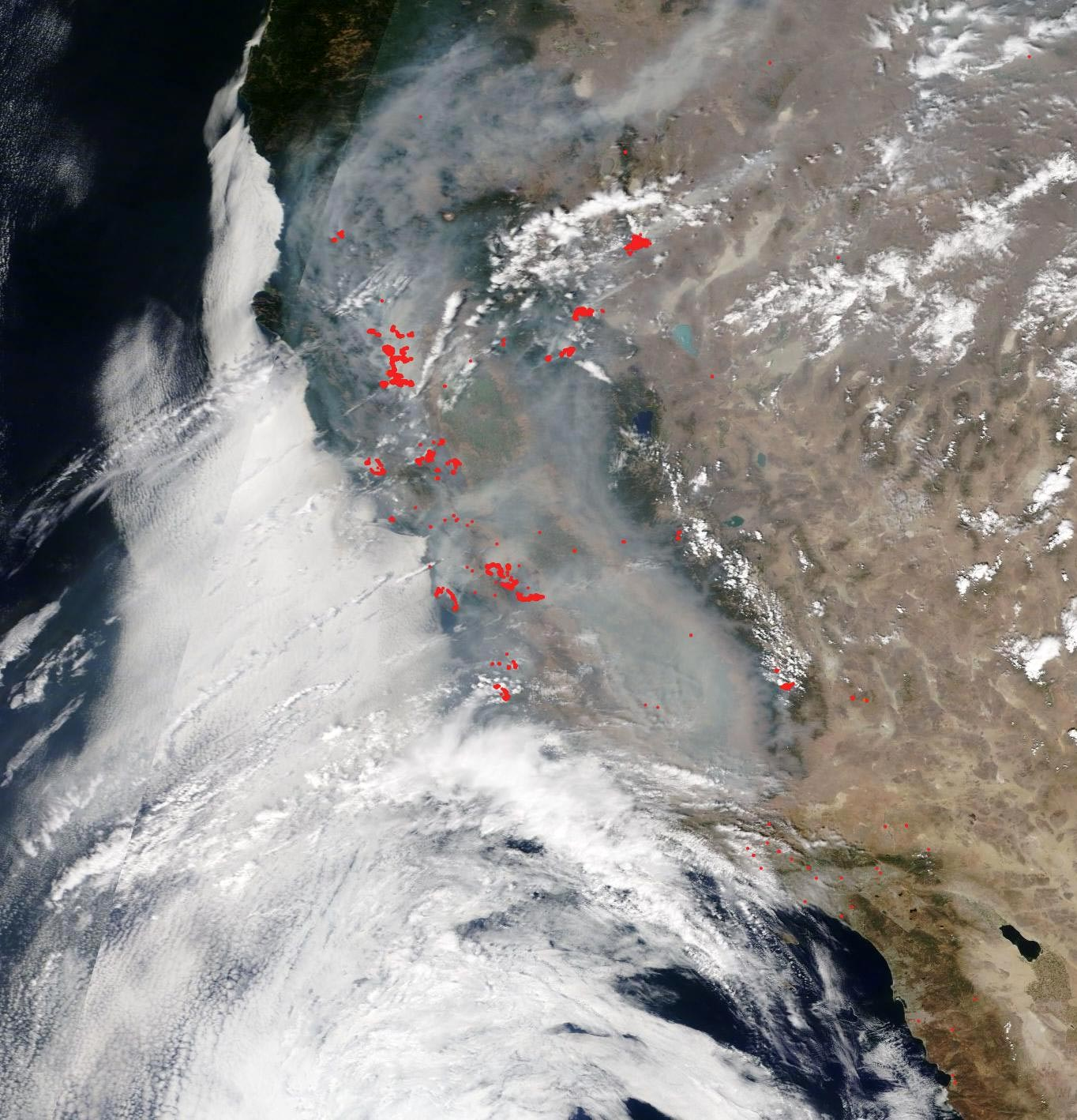
- NASA satellite image of the wildfires on August 24, 2020
- Date: August 11, 2020 – January 5, 2021
- Location: California

Statistics
- Total fires: 650
- Total area: Over 2,529,000 acres (1,023,450 ha)

Impacts
- Deaths: 23
- Injuries: 43
- Structures destroyed: 3,586+
- Cost: Unknown

Ignition
- Cause: Lightning

A series of 650 wildfires ignited across Northern California in mid-August 2020, due to a siege of dry lightning from rare, massive summer thunderstorms, which were caused by an unusual combination of very hot, dry air at the surface, dry fuels, and advection of moisture from the remains of Tropical Storm Fausto northward into the Bay Area. These fires burned between 1,500,000 acres (6,100 km^{2}) to 2,100,000 acres (8,500 km^{2}) within a 2–3 week period. The August 2020 lightning fires included three enormous wildfires: the SCU Lightning Complex, the August Complex, and the LNU Lightning Complex. On September 10, 2020, the August Complex set a record for the single-largest wildfire in the modern history of California, reaching a total area burned of 471,185 acres (1,907 km^{2}). On September 11, the August Complex merged with the Elkhorn Fire, another massive wildfire of 255,039 acres (1,032 km^{2}), turning the August Complex into a monster wildfire of 746,607 acres (3,021 km^{2}).

The three major Bay Area fires, the SCU, LNU, and the CZU Lightning Complex, collectively burned about 846,000 acres (3,420 km^{2}) by mid-September 2020, destroyed 2,723 structures, and took 6 lives.

== Meteorological background ==
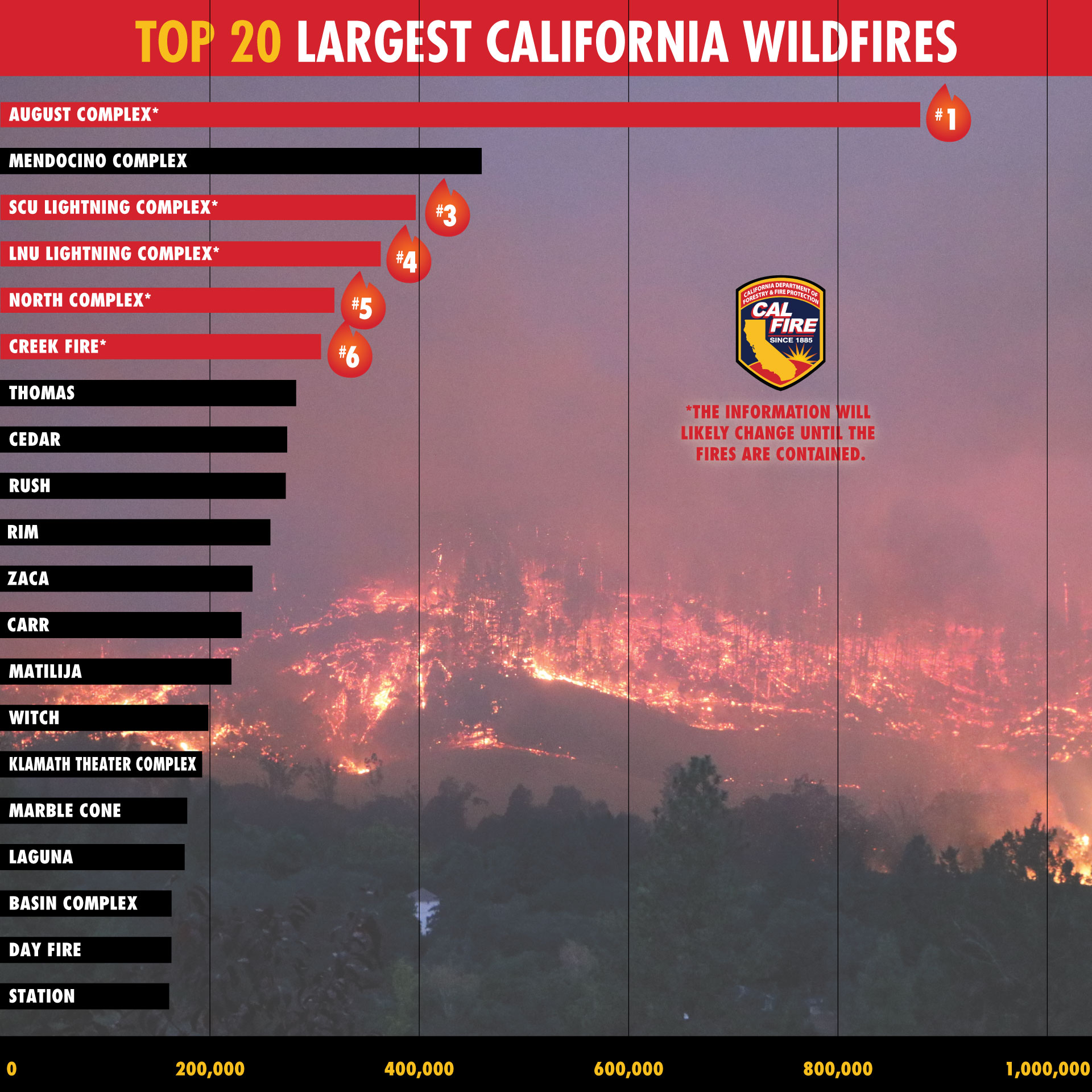
August 2020 began a record breaking season for wildfires. Of the twenty largest wildfires in California history, six were part of the 2020 wildfire season. Four of the new wildfires ranking in the top 10 were all a part of the August 2020 lightning fires.

Between August 14 and August 16, Northern California was subjected to record-breaking warm temperatures, due to anomalously strong high pressure over the region. Early on August 15, the National Weather Service for San Francisco issued a Fire Weather Watch highlighting the risk of wildfire starts due to the combination of lightning risk due to moist, unstable air aloft, dry fuels, and hot temperatures near the surface. Later that day, the Fire Weather Watch was upgraded to a Red Flag Warning, noting the risk of abundant lightning already apparent as the storms moved toward the region from the south.

The source of this plume of moist, unstable air was the weakening Tropical Storm Fausto. Due to abnormal winds, this plume was streaming from up to 1,000 miles (1,600 km) off the coast of the Baja Peninsula into Northern California. This moisture then interacted with a high-pressure ridge situated over Nevada that was bringing a long-track heat wave to much of California and the West. These colliding weather systems then created excessive atmospheric instability that generated massive thunderstorms throughout much of Northern and Central California. Such thunderstorms are rare for California, but were more typical of Midwest garden-variety storms, with one location near Travis Air Force Base going from around 80 °F (27 °C) to 100 °F (38 °C) in nearly 1–2 hours. Additionally, much of these storms were only accompanied with dry lightning and produced little to no rain, making conditions very favorable for wildfires to spark and spread rapidly.

Early morning on August 16, when the first thunderstorms hit, around 2,500 lightning strikes hit the Bay Area, with 200 strikes happening in 30 minutes at one point, which the National Weather Service office in Bay Area labelled as "insane". Within the next 72–96 hours, over 12,000 lightning strikes were recorded over Northern California. These lightning strikes sparked up to 585 wildfires, many of which grew to be very large at a rapid pace due to parched brush, especially in Northern California.

A second wave of thunderstorms was forecasted to hit on August 23 and 24; however, they failed to materialize over the Bay Area, which has been most impacted by these fires, and instead just produced light rain and a few lightning strikes over the Sierra Nevada, barely having any impact.

== Fires ==
Many of the fires were started or discovered on August 16 or 17:

Name	County	Acres	Start date	Containment date	Notes	Ref
Wolf	Tuolumne	2,057	August 11	November 20	Lightning-sparked	
Lake	Los Angeles	31,089	August 12	September 28	Lightning-sparked, 33 structures destroyed; 6 damaged; 21 outbuildings destroyed; 2 injuries	
Hills	Fresno	2,121	August 15	August 24	Lightning-sparked; 1 fatality	
Loyalton	Lassen, Plumas, Sierra	47,029	August 15	September 14	Lightning-sparked, Caused National Weather Service to issue first ever Fire Tornado Warning; 5 homes, 6 outbuildings destroyed	
River	Monterey	48,088	August 16	September 4	Caused by a lightning strike, 4 injuries	
Dome	San Bernardino	43,273	August 16	September 14	Caused by a lightning strike, burned in the Mojave National Preserve	
Beach	Mono	3,780	August 16	August 28	Caused by a lightning strike	
SCU Lightning Complex	Santa Clara, Alameda, Contra Costa, San Joaquin, Merced, Stanislaus	396,624	August 16	October 1	Deer Zone, Marsh, Canyon Zone and other surrounding fires combined into one multi-fire incident by CalFire; all believed to have been sparked by an intense and widespread lightning storm; 136 structures destroyed; 26 structures damaged; 5 injuries.	
August Complex	Glenn, Mendocino, Lake, Tehama, Trinity	1,032,648	August 16	November 12	Lightning strikes started 37 fires and the Elkhorn Fire, several of which grew to large sizes, especially the Doe Fire; the fire merged with the Elkhorn Fire on September 11, becoming the largest recorded wildfire in California history. 933 structures destroyed; 2 injuries; 1 fatality	
CZU Lightning Complex	San Mateo, Santa Cruz	86,509	August 16	September 22	Several lightning-sparked fires burning close together across San Mateo and Santa Cruz Counties; 1,490 structures destroyed; 140 structures damaged; 1 injury; 1 fatality.	
Rattlesnake	Tulare	8,419	August 16	December 29	Lightning sparked a slow-growing fire in inaccessible terrain.	
LNU Lightning Complex	Colusa, Lake, Napa, Sonoma, Solano, Yolo	363,220	August 17	October 2	Multi-fire incident that includes the Hennessey Fire (305,651 acres), the Walbridge Fire (55,209 acres), and the Meyers Fire (2,360 acres) sparked by lightning; 1,491 structures destroyed; 232 structures damaged; 4 injuries; 6 fatalities. It is the fifth-largest fire complex in California history.	
Butte/Tehama/Glenn Lightning Complex (Butte Zone)	Butte	19,609	August 17	October 16	Lightning sparked 34 fires throughout Butte County	
North Complex	Plumas, Butte	318,935	August 17	December 4	Lightning strikes, includes the Claremont Fire and the Bear Fire; 2,471 structures destroyed; 31 structures damaged; 16 fatalities; 13 injuries; It is the sixth-largest fire in modern California history.	
Jones	Nevada	705	August 17	August 28	Lightning sparked, 21 structures destroyed, 3 structures damaged, 7 injuries	
Sheep	Plumas, Lassen	29,570	August 17	September 9	Lightning-sparked, 26 structures destroyed, 1 injury	
Salt	Calaveras	1,789	August 18	August 24	Lightning-sparked	
W-5 Cold Springs	Lassen	84,817	August 18	September 14	Lightning-sparked	
Carmel	Monterey	6,905	August 18	September 4	Lightning-sparked, 73 structures destroyed; 7 structures damaged	
Woodward	Marin	4,929	August 19	October 2	Lightning-sparked, 1,600 structures threatened	
SQF Complex	Tulare	174,178	August 19, 2020	January 5, 2021	Lightning-sparked, contains the Castle Fire (168,913 acres) and the Shotgun Fire (841 acres)	
Moc	Tuolumne	2,857	August 20	August 30	Lightning-sparked	

Location of August 2020 wildfires

=== CZU Lightning Complex ===
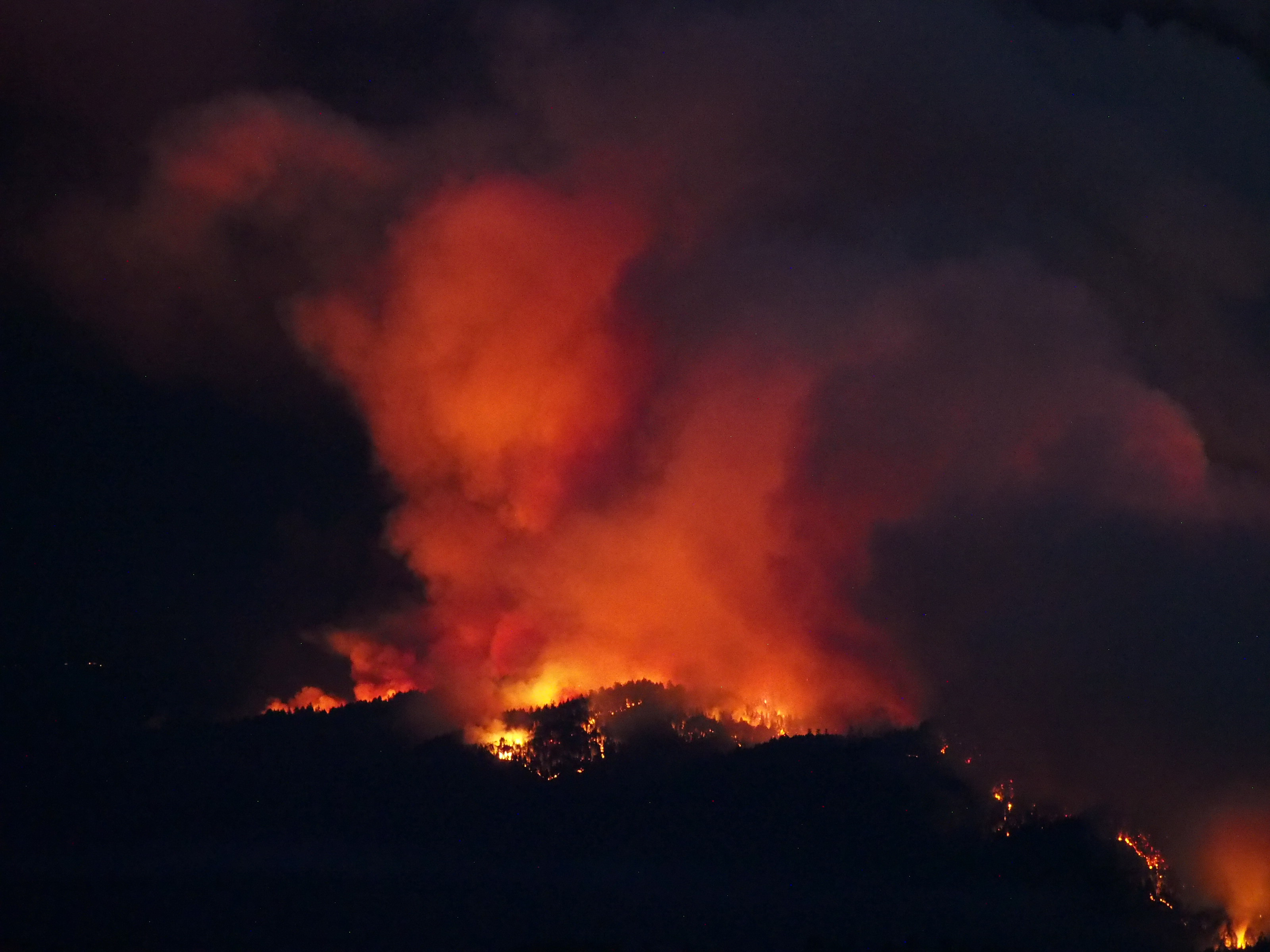
The CZU lightning complex fire burns along Butano Ridge and in Pescadero Creek Park, in the Santa Cruz Mountains, California. Pictured here on 19 August, this fire would later grow to over 85,000 acres and destroy over 900 structures

By August 20, the fire had caused extensive damage to the Big Basin Redwoods State Park. The towns of Pescadero and La Honda were threatened by flames.

=== LNU Lightning Complex ===
The LNU Lighting Complex was a complex of 7 different fires in the Sonoma, Lake, and Napa counties, with 4 major ones being the Hennessey, Gamble, 15-10, and 13-4 Fires. It first sparked around 6:37 AM on August 17, when a lightning storm passed over the Lake Hennessey area. Another lightning strike occurred at 6:39, near the Aonair winery, starting a fire that was 5 acres large. About 60 fires had sparked in the region during that time period, however, while some blazes were quickly contained at 1 or 2 acres, others rapidly went out of control. Around 9 AM, dry, gale-force winds between 20 and 40 miles per hour helped to fan the flames of two uncontrolled blazes, the Gamble Fire and the Hennessey Fire. This caused the Hennessey Fire to explode to 2,400 acres (9.7 km^{2}) by 5 PM August 17, prompting several evacuations. By the night of August 18, the LNU complex had burned a total of 32,025 acres (129.60 km^{2}) so far with no containment. 3 structures were destroyed, and the two biggest fires, the Hennessey and the Gamble Fires, both expanded to 10,000 acres (40 km^{2}). On August 19, the fire raced fast towards Vacaville, and caused hundreds of evacuations. Many people fled the city with only their basic necessities, with police officers and firefighters going door to door warning people to evacuate. By August 20, the LNU fire had burned 215,000 acres (870 km^{2}) and destroyed 480 structures. It forced the evacuation of some personnel in the Travis Air Force Base and the city of Healdsburg, California, that had already evacuated previously during the Tubbs Fire and the Kincade Fire.

=== SCU Lightning Complex ===
The SCU Lightning Complex was a cluster of 20 different fires in the Santa Clara, Contra Costa, Alameda, Stanislaus, and San Joaquin counties, that was divided into 3 different zones - the Deer Zone, Calaveras Zone, and Canyon Zone. By August 18, the fires had expanded to over 35,000 acres (140 km^{2}) with only 4 percent containment. By August 20, the fire burned 140,000 acres (570 km^{2}) and was 5% contained, evacuating people in the East San Jose foothills, and threatening the Lick Observatory with flames. On August 21, the SCU fire had exploded overnight by more than 40%, reaching a total of 230,000 acres (930 km^{2}) and being 10% contained.

== Impacts ==
The North Complex fire's Bear Fire had destroyed the town of Berry Creek. The SCU Lightning Complex fires have threatened the cities of Fremont, Milpitas, Patterson, and San Jose, and also threatened Lick Observatory.

=== Air quality and smoke pollution ===
On September 9, 2020, the sky appeared orange across the Bay Area due to wildfire smoke.

== See also ==
- 2020 California wildfires
- 2020 Western United States wildfires
