= SCU Lightning Complex fires =

2020 wildfire in Northern California

- Part of the August 2020 California lightning siege
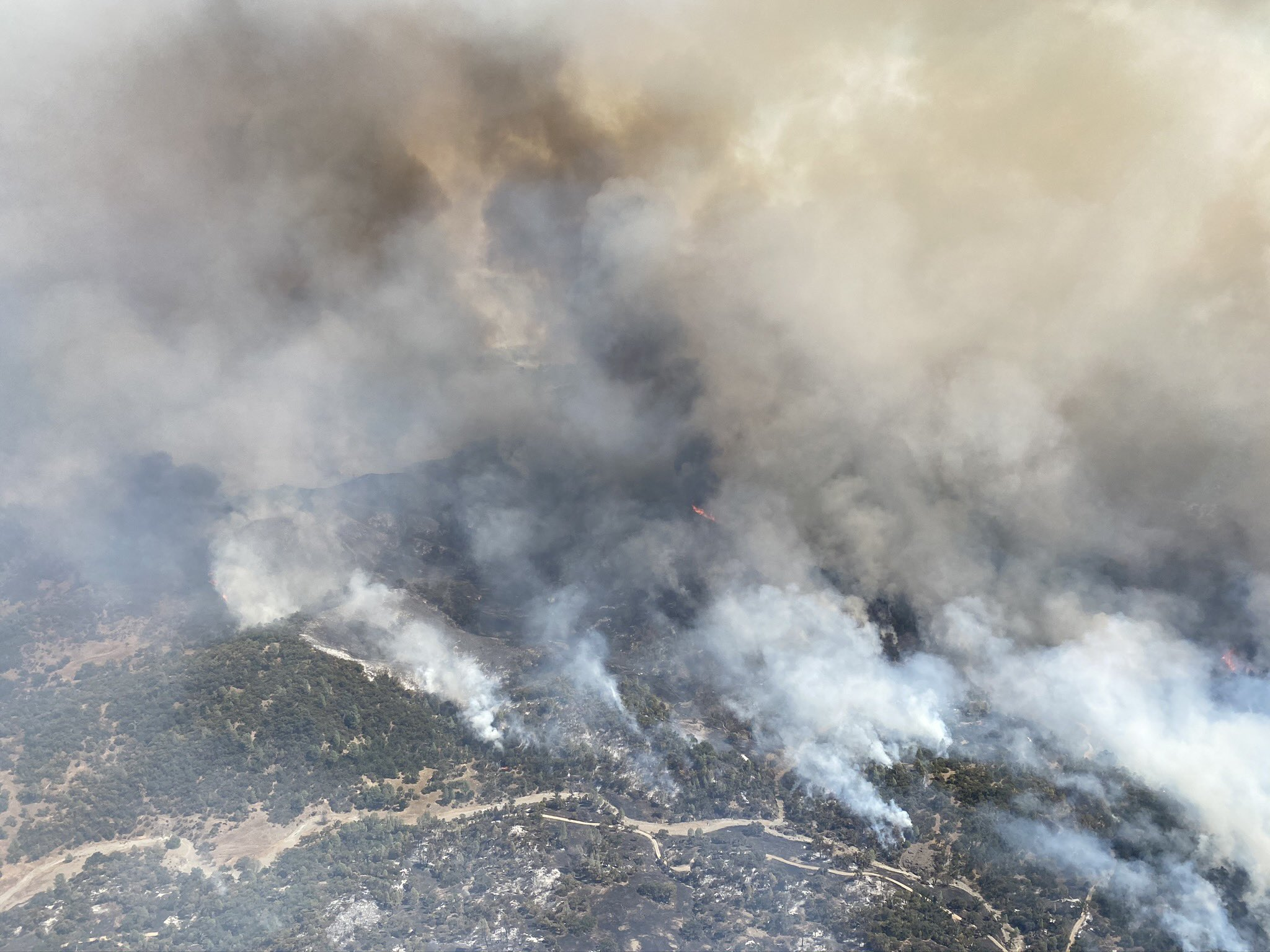
- SCU Lightning Complex fires on August 22, 2020.
- Date: August 16, 2020 –; October 1, 2020
- Location: San Francisco Bay Area (East Bay); Central Valley: Santa Clara; Alameda; Contra Costa; San Joaquin; Merced; Stanislaus
- Coordinates: 37.439437°N 121.30435°W

Statistics
- Total area: 396,624 acres (160,508 ha)

Impacts
- Deaths: 0
- Injuries: 6
- Structures destroyed: 222

Ignition
- Cause: Lightning

Map
- Perimeter of SCU Lightning Complex fires

The SCU (Santa Clara Unit) Lightning Complex fires were wildfires that burned in the Diablo Range in California in August and September 2020 as part of the 2020 California wildfire season. The fire complex consisted of fires in Santa Clara, Alameda, Contra Costa, San Joaquin, Merced, and Stanislaus counties. The name is derived from the three-letter designation given to the California Department of Forestry and Fire Protection (Cal Fire) division responsible for the Santa Clara, Alameda, Contra Costa, and parts of San Joaquin and Stanislaus counties, and the complex consisted of several distinct fires occurring in this region.

The complex fire burned a total of 393,624 acres (159,294 ha) from August 16 to October 1, 2020, making it the fifth-largest overall wildfire recorded in California's modern history, surpassed only by the 2018 Mendocino Complex Fire, the 2021 Dixie Fire, the 2024 Park Fire, and the 2020 August Complex fire. The SCU Complex was one of several fire complexes burning during August and September in California, most notably the LNU, CZU, and August complexes.

== Progression ==
The fire complex started on August 16, 2020. It consisted of three zones: the Deer Zone in Contra Costa County; the Canyon Zone in Alameda, Santa Clara and parts of Stanislaus counties; and the Calaveras zone in parts of Stanislaus, San Joaquin and Merced counties.

On August 20, the fires reached Lick Observatory, an astronomical telescopic observatory operated by the University of California, located on Mount Hamilton. One residential building not in use was destroyed, and some other residential buildings were damaged, but the telescope domes themselves did not burn.

By August 26, the Deer zone was fully contained, and the other Canyon and Calaveras zones had grown together into a single branch of the fire.

On October 1, Cal Fire reported that the entire fire complex had been fully contained.

== Effects ==
=== Casualties and property damage ===
The fire complex had destroyed 222 structures, damaged another 26, and injured 6 people. No fatalities were recorded.

=== Land ecology ===
A year following the fire the East Bay Regional Park District (EBRPD) and Save Mount Diablo (SMD) monitored the fire impact on the 6,000 acres of the park district lands. Their observation was that the burn was mostly beneficial for the ecology of the region, despite its extent. This was attributed to the fire's moderate to low intensity which spared most of the park trees, rejuvenated vegetation and triggered germination of rare species of fire poppies. The study prompted CalFire officials to consider increasing the use of prescribed burning in Alameda and Contra Costa counties.

== See also ==
- List of California wildfires
- 2020 California wildfires
