= Lake Fire (2020) =

2020 wildfire in Southern California

- Part of the August 2020 California lightning siege
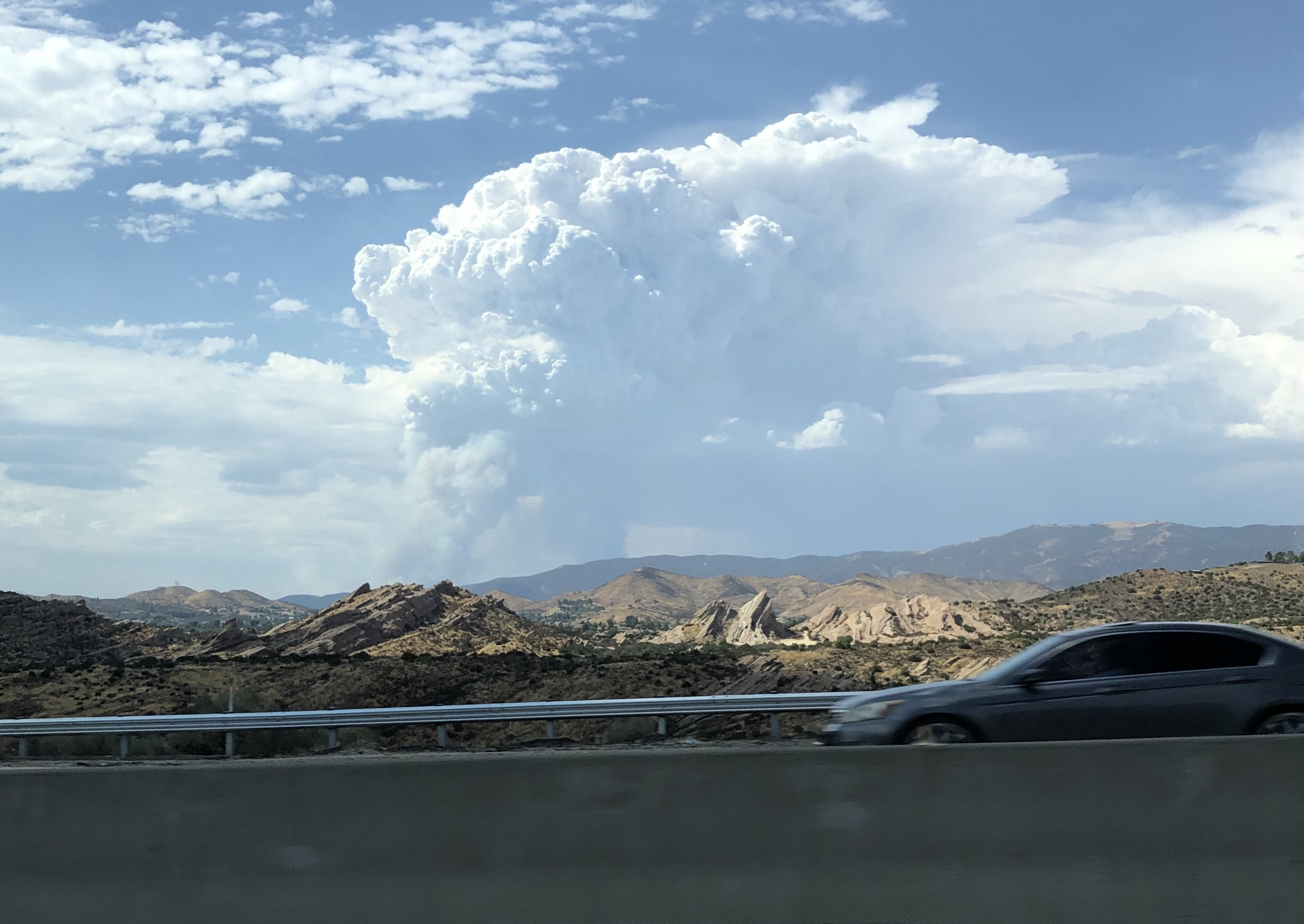
- The Lake Fire from the Highway 14 South
- Date: August 12, 2020 –; September 28, 2020
- Location: Angeles National Forest, Los Angeles County, California, United States
- Coordinates: 34.679°N 118.452°W

Statistics
- Burned area: 31,089 acres (12,581 ha)
- Land use: Recreational

Impacts
- Injuries: 4 firefighters
- Structures lost: 12 structures; 21 outbuildings

Ignition
- Cause: Unknown

Map
- Location of Lake Fire in California

The Lake Fire was a wildfire that burned during the 2020 California wildfire season in the Angeles National Forest in Los Angeles County in the state of California in the United States. The fire, which was first reported on August 12, 2020, burned 31,089 acres (12,581 ha) near Lake Hughes. It was fully contained on September 28. The cause of the fire remains unknown. The fire damaged 3 structures, destroyed 12 structures and 21 outbuildings, and injured 4 firefighters.

== Progression ==
The Lake Fire was first reported burning near Lake Hughes in Angeles National Forest at 3:38 PM on August 12, 2020. Burning in an area that was last burned by a wildfire in 1968, dry chaparral fueled the start of the fire. The fire grew to 1,000 acres (405 ha) in under an hour of being reported. By the early evening the fire had grown to 10,000 acres (4,047 ha) and mandatory evacuations were put in place, including for Lake Hughes and areas south of Highway 138. A pyrocumulus cloud due to the fire was visible from Santa Cruz Island.

By the morning of August 15, the fire had damaged 3 structures and destroyed 6 structures and 15 outbuildings. That afternoon, crews had secured containment on a portion of the fire totaling 12 percent. On August 17, the fire continued to move northwest fueled by bigcone Douglas-fir, oak trees and gray pines, eight miles to the northeast of Interstate 5. One firefighter suffered a minor injury. Containment was progressed on the right flank, while the left flank saw spot fires from fire whirls. That same day, an air quality advisory was put in place for San Bernardino and Los Angeles Counties. The fire had grown to 21,115 acres (8,545 ha) with 38 percent containment by the morning of August 18. That day, the Los Angeles County Board of Supervisors passed a proclamation declaring a local emergency for the fire.

The fire jumped the containment line southwest of Atmore Meadows overnight into the morning of August 19, requiring helicopters to do night drops in the rugged, hard to reach area. That day, the fire grew further into Atmore Meadows and into Burnt Peak Canyon on the west flank. Repopulation began on August 21 along Shafer Road, west of Mountain View Road, south of Highway 138 and north of Pine Canyon/Elizabeth Lake Road. That evening, containment grew to over 50 percent. Repopulation continued on August 24, with residents along Kings Canyon Road east to Shafer Road being allowed to return, and on August 25, with residents south of Highway 138 and other evacuated areas.

On the evening of August 25, it was announced that three additional firefighters suffered injuries in the fire. All mandatory evacuation orders and smoke advisories were lifted. Suppression repair began two days later, on August 27 with the fire at 70 percent containment. The majority of Castaic Lake State Recreation Area, which was used as a staging area, reopened to the public. As August ended, the fire had burned 31,089 acres (12,581 ha) and was 90 percent contained, however, the complete resources to complete full fire suppression was delayed due to the lack of resources available because of the August 2020 California lightning wildfires.

== Effects ==
The Lake Fire threatened over 4,570 structures in the area, including homes. On August 13, mandatory evacuations were put in place for areas around Lake Hughes and portions of Highway 138 were closed. This resulted in the evacuation of 100 residences. Highland High School was opened as an evacuation point and evacuees were asked to camp in their cars, due to the inability to set up a traditional evacuation center due to the COVID-19 pandemic. Repopulation began on August 21.

The fire damaged 3 structures and destroyed 12 structures and 21 outbuildings, including homes in the Pine Canyon community. One firefighter was injured.

It also impacted recreational activities. Castaic Lake State Recreation Area was closed to the public to be used for meetings and staging for the duration of the fire until August 28.

The fire impacted air quality in Los Angeles and San Bernardino Counties. Air quality suffered and smoke and ash was visible in Lebec, Antelope Valley, Agua Dulce, and Santa Clarita Valley.

The following areas were closed into September 2021 due to the Lake Fire:

- All National Forest System lands within the Lake Fire closure area
- Castaic Lake Recreation Area Swim Beach and West Ramp

== See also ==
- 2020 California wildfires
