= CZU Lightning Complex fires =

2020 wildfire in California

- Part of the August 2020 California lightning siege
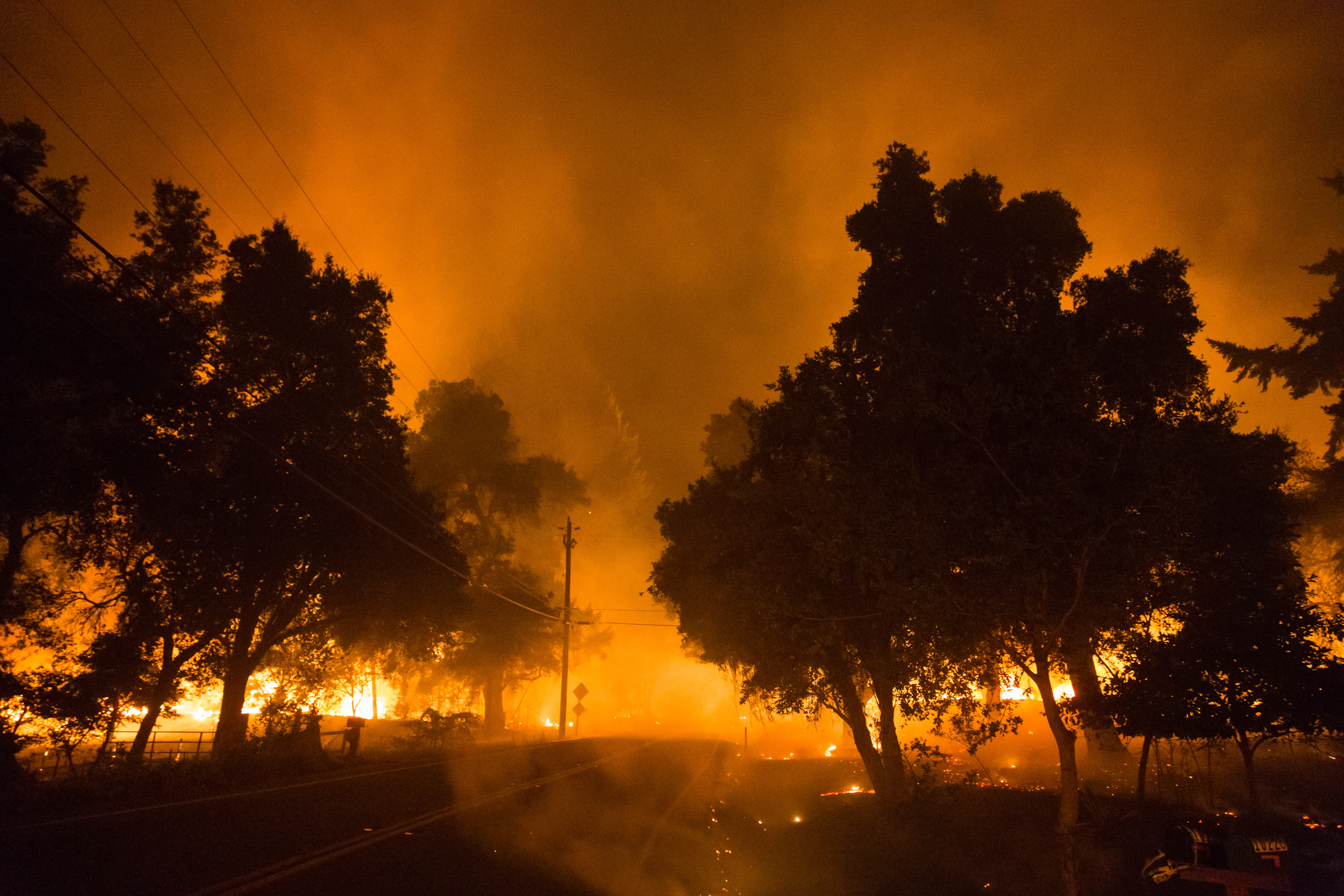
- The CZU Lightning Complex wildfire burns along Empire Grade in Bonny Doon, Calif. early Thursday morning, August 20, 2020.
- Date: August 16, 2020 –; September 22, 2020
- Location: San Mateo and Santa Cruz counties, California
- Coordinates: 37°11′02.8″N 122°14′40.4″W

Statistics
- Total area: 86,509 acres (35,009 ha)

Impacts
- Deaths: 1
- Injuries: 1
- Structures lost: 1,490

Ignition
- Cause: Lightning

Map
- Location of CZU Lightning Complex Fires in Northern California

The CZU Lightning Complex fires were wildfires that burned in Northern California starting in August 2020. The fire complex consisted of fires in San Mateo and Santa Cruz counties, including fires that had previously been separately tracked as the Warnella and Waddell fires. The firefighting effort was primarily administered by the California Department of Forestry and Fire Protection (Cal Fire).

The first fires started around 3:30 am on August 16, 2020, the result of a thunderstorm that produced close to 11,000 bolts of lightning and started hundreds of fires throughout California. These lightning strikes initially started fires separately known as the Warnella Fire, near Davenport and the Waddell Fire, near Waddell Creek, as well as three fires on what would become the northern edge of the CZU Complex fire. Two days after the fires began, a change in wind conditions caused these three northern fires to rapidly expand and merge, growing quickly to over 40,000 acres.

The fires destroyed 1,490 buildings, including in the communities of Boulder Creek, Bonny Doon, Swanton, and along Empire Grade Road. Fires burned in both Butano and Big Basin Redwoods state parks, where a number of historic buildings were destroyed, including the visitor center at Big Basin. The fire also threatened to burn down the University of California, Santa Cruz campus, reaching within one mile of the campus before firefighters established two fire breaks that stopped the fire, saving both the University and the city of Santa Cruz.

On September 22, Cal Fire reported that the complex, which had covered 86,509 acres (35,009 ha), had been fully contained. On December 23 Cal Fire announced that the fire was controlled, stating that the fire was fully extinguished and has no risk of reignition. However, it was later discovered that the fire was not quite completely extinguished; redwoods continued to smolder well into 2021.

The abbreviation "CZU" refers to the Cal Fire designation for its San Mateo–Santa Cruz Unit, the administrative division for San Mateo, Santa Cruz and San Francisco counties.

73-year-old Tad Jones, from the community of Last Chance near Davenport, died in the fire. One other person was injured.

The documentary The CZU Fire In Their Own Words – Fighting Fires, Losing Homes, and Rebuilding Community covers the fires and was created and directed by Boulder Creek resident Peter Gelblum.

== See also ==
- 2020 California wildfires
- August 2020 California lightning wildfires
  - LNU Lightning Complex fires
  - SCU Lightning Complex fires
  - SQF Complex
