= LNU Lightning Complex fires =

2020 wildfire in Northern California

- Part of the August 2020 California lightning siege
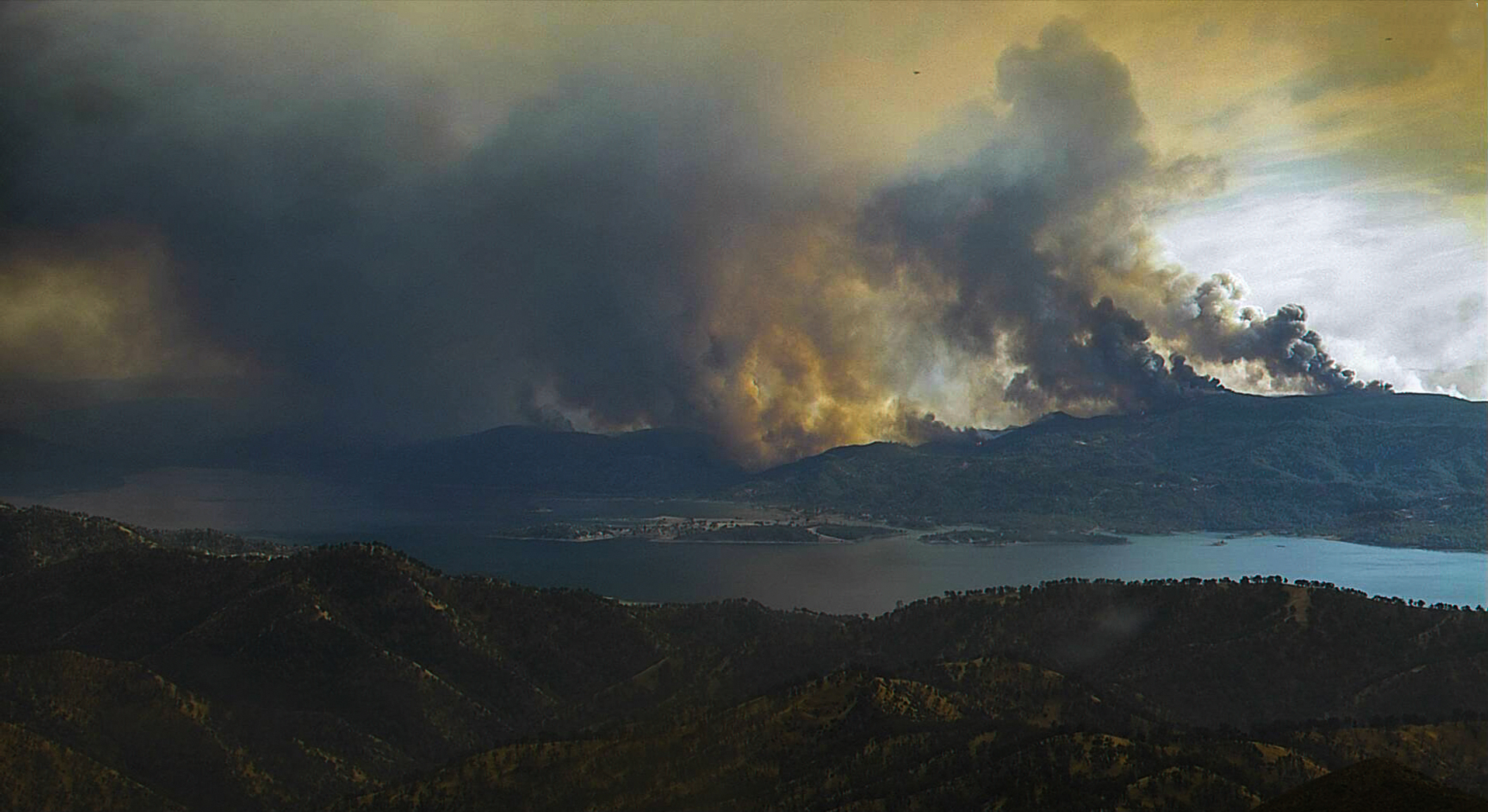
- The Hennessey and Spanish Fires burn towards Lake Berryessa on August 18, 2020.
- Date: August 17, 2020 –; October 2, 2020
- Location: Northern California: Colusa; Lake; Napa; Sonoma; Solano; Yolo

Statistics
- Total fires: 250
- Total area: 363,220 acres (146,990 ha)

Impacts
- Deaths: 6 civilians
- Injuries: 5
- Structures lost: 1,491 structures destroyed, 232 damaged

Ignition
- Cause: Lightning/Arson

Location of Northern California wildfires
Perimeters of LNU Lightning Complex fires

The LNU Lightning Complex fires were a large complex of wildfires that burned during the 2020 California wildfire season across much of the Wine Country area of Northern California – Lake, Napa, Sonoma, Solano, and Yolo Counties, from August 17 to October 2, 2020. The complex was composed of numerous lightning-sparked fires, most of which were small. While they ignited separately from each other, the Hennessey Fire eventually grew to merge with the Gamble, Green, Markley, Spanish, and Morgan fires, scorching 192,000 acres (777 km^{2}) by itself, for a total burn area of 363,220 acres (1,470 km^{2}) in the complex. The fire, which burned in the hills surrounding several large cities, such as Fairfield, Napa, and Vacaville, destroyed 1,491 structures and damaged a further 232. In all, six people were killed and another five injured. The LNU Lightning Complex is the seventh-largest wildfire in California history.

== Name ==
The name of the complex fire refers to the name of the local unit of the California Department of Forestry and Fire Protection (Cal Fire), the Sonoma–Lake–Napa Unit (LNU).

== Timeline ==
In the early morning hours of Sunday, August 16 through Monday, August 17, a series of highly unusual thunderstorms rolled through most of northern California, which came from the moisture of the diminishing Tropical Storm Fausto. With these thunderstorms came a reported 10,849 lightning strikes that – within a 72-hour period – sparked 376 known fires across much of the state.

=== Monday, August 17 ===
Early on Monday, August 17, at around 6:40 am PDT a spot fire was reported burning in the 60 block of Hennessey Ridge Road near Lake Hennessey which was initially dubbed the 14-3 Fire but then later named the Hennessey Fire. The incident was reported alongside several other fires nearby. These included the Gamble Fire, which began burning in an area off Berryessa Knoxville Road north of Lake Berryessa and west of State Route 16; the Spanish Fire, which was burning near Spanish Flat; the 15-10 Fire, burning near Putah Bridge; and the Markley Fire, near Monticello Dam. Resources to fight these fires were scarce due to the high number of other fires burning throughout California at the time. Because of this, the fires were not suppressed during their most critical early phases, and by the evening of that day, the multiple conflagrations sizes were all ranging between 1,000 and 8,000 acres with 0% containment for each fire.

=== Tuesday, August 18 ===
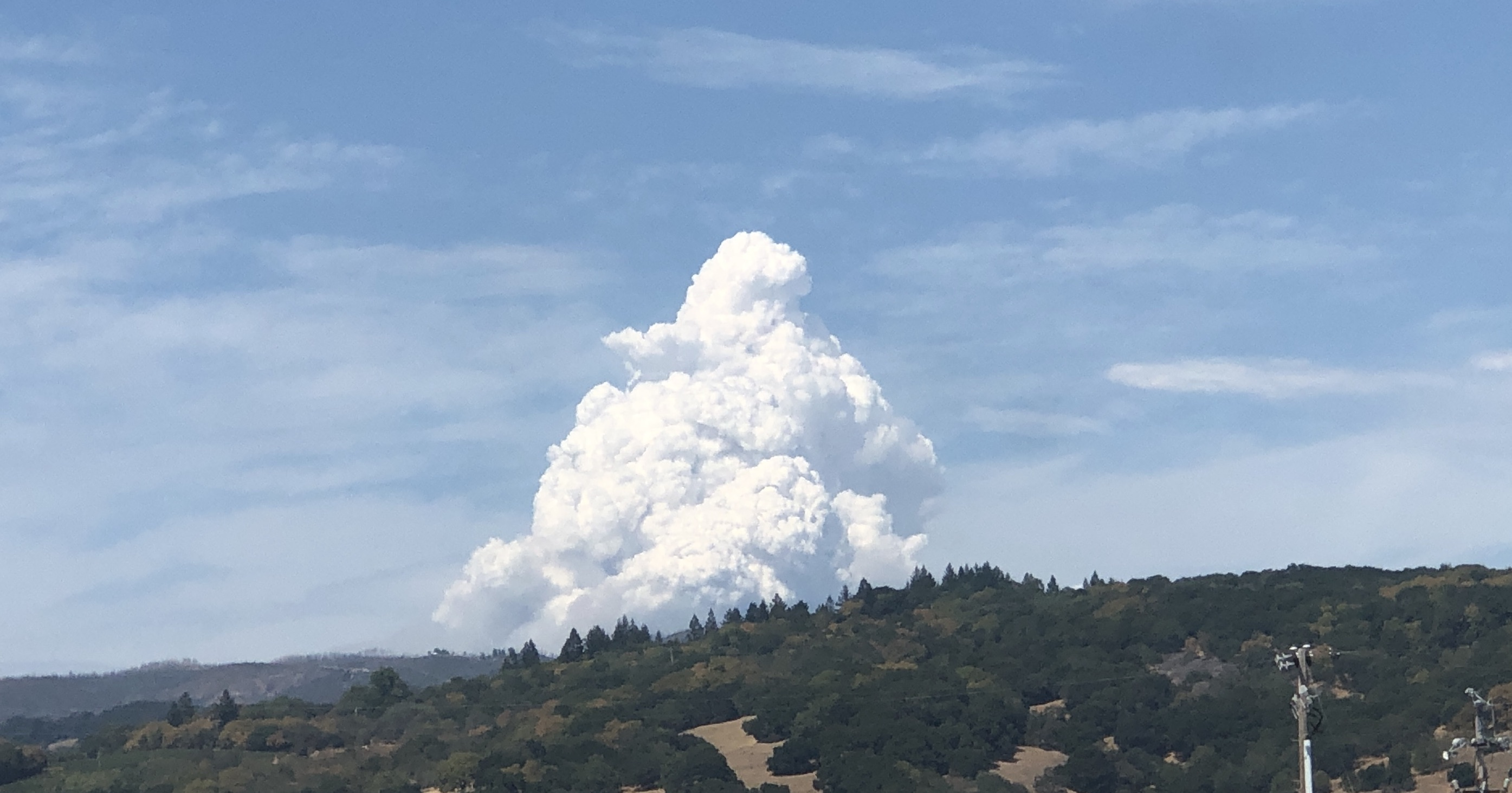
The Hennessey Fire as seen from Sonoma

By the morning of August 18, the complex of fires burning through much of the Napa County region collectively encompassed over 12,000 acres. By this time, only several hundred firefighters were actively engaging the fires. Air attack reported additional spot fires beginning to flare up due to the deteriorating weather conditions, as at least 20 to 30 new fires ignited by lightning the day prior were discovered. One of those ignitions was the actively expanding Walbridge Fire (then the 13-4 Fire) that had started in rugged hills north of the Austin Creek State Recreation Area of Sonoma County. Evacuation warnings were put in place for the rural area in the hills between Healdsburg and Stewarts Point as the fire burned virtually unchecked. Those evacuations were then expanded to include areas east of Sewell Road and King Ridge Road; north of Old Cazadero Road and Austin Creek; west of East Austin Creek and Wal Bridge Ridge; and south of Stewarts Point Skaggs Springs Road --as well as Guerneville, Monte Rio and other areas north of the Russian River-- which displaced hundreds of residences by nightfall as the fire grew to 500 acres.

Meanwhile, a 15 acre fire had also been spotted burning between Meyers Grade and Highway 1 north of the community of Jenner after being caused by lightning the day prior and would later be dubbed the Meyers Fire as it also rapidly expanded in the area. Mandatory evacuations were put in place for areas west of Meyers Grade Road, south of Fort Ross Road and North of the intersection of Meyers Grade Road and Highway 1 throughout the day.

Evacuations orders that initially were put in place for roads near the Hennessey Fire off of Hennessey Ridge Road and Highway 128 and along Chiles Pope Valley Road and Lower Chiles Valley Road began to expand for much of the surrounding Lake Berryessa area as the fire and multiple other conflagrations effectively exploded in size in that area. These mandatory evacuations were put in place for the Berryessa Highlands and Spanish Flat areas as the fires rapidly raged towards those communities. By this time, the Hennessey Fire has reportedly only destroyed one structure and two outbuildings in the area and threatened 205 structures, however an additional 390 homes in the Berryessa Estates area were now reportedly threatened and multiple structures were reported burning throughout the valley. Later that afternoon, the fire further threatened additional rural areas along Highway 128 as it jumped the two-lane winding highway twice and it raced towards the Vaca Mountains bordering Napa and Solano County.

At 8:15 pm on Tuesday night, CAL FIRE has reported that the Hennessey Fire had consumed 10,000 acres, the Gamble Fire off of Berryessa Knoxville Road has also consumed 10,000 acres, the Spanish Fire near Spanish Flat had grown to 1,000 acres, the "15-10" near Putah Creek Bridge had burned 8,000 acres, and the newly-ignited Markley Fire near the Monticello Dam had also grown to 2,500 acres. All of them were reported to be zero percent contained that night. By 11:30 pm, the Hennessey Fire was seen still burning at a critical to dangerous rate of spread as the massive conflagration had traveled 13 miles to the southeast scorching the Vaca Mountains and rolled down the canyons towards the city of Fairfield and Vacaville. This dangerous fire spread spurred additional mandatory evacuations for north Fairfield and northwest Vacaville as the fireline made its way down Mix Canyon Road to Pleasants Valley Road and proceeded to destroy hundreds of structures in areas to the west and north of the cities.

=== September ===
In September, fire activity decreased significantly within the complex, as firefighters brought most of the fire complex under control. By mid-September, only the Hennessey and Walbridge Fires were still burning within the complex. On October 2, 2020, CAL FIRE reported that the entire complex had been extinguished.

== Fires ==
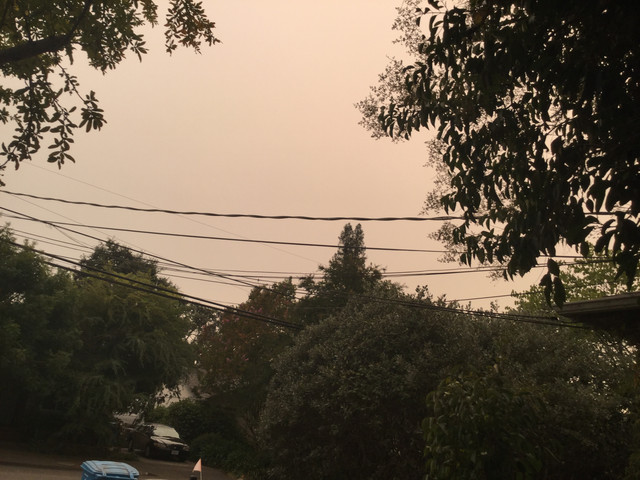
Smoke from the Walbridge fire over Santa Rosa

Name	County	Acres	Start date	Containment	Deaths	Notes	Ref
Hennessey	Napa	305,651	August 17, 2020	100% contained		Merged with the Gamble, Green, Aetna, Markley, Spanish, Morgan, and Round fires.	
Walbridge	Sonoma	55,209	August 17, 2020	100% contained		Merged with the Stewarts Fire	
Meyers	Sonoma	2,360	August 17, 2020	100% contained			

== See also ==
- 2020 California wildfires
  - SCU Lightning Complex fires
  - CZU Lightning Complex fires
  - SQF Complex
  - Glass Fire
- List of California wildfires
