= Delta Stewardship Council =

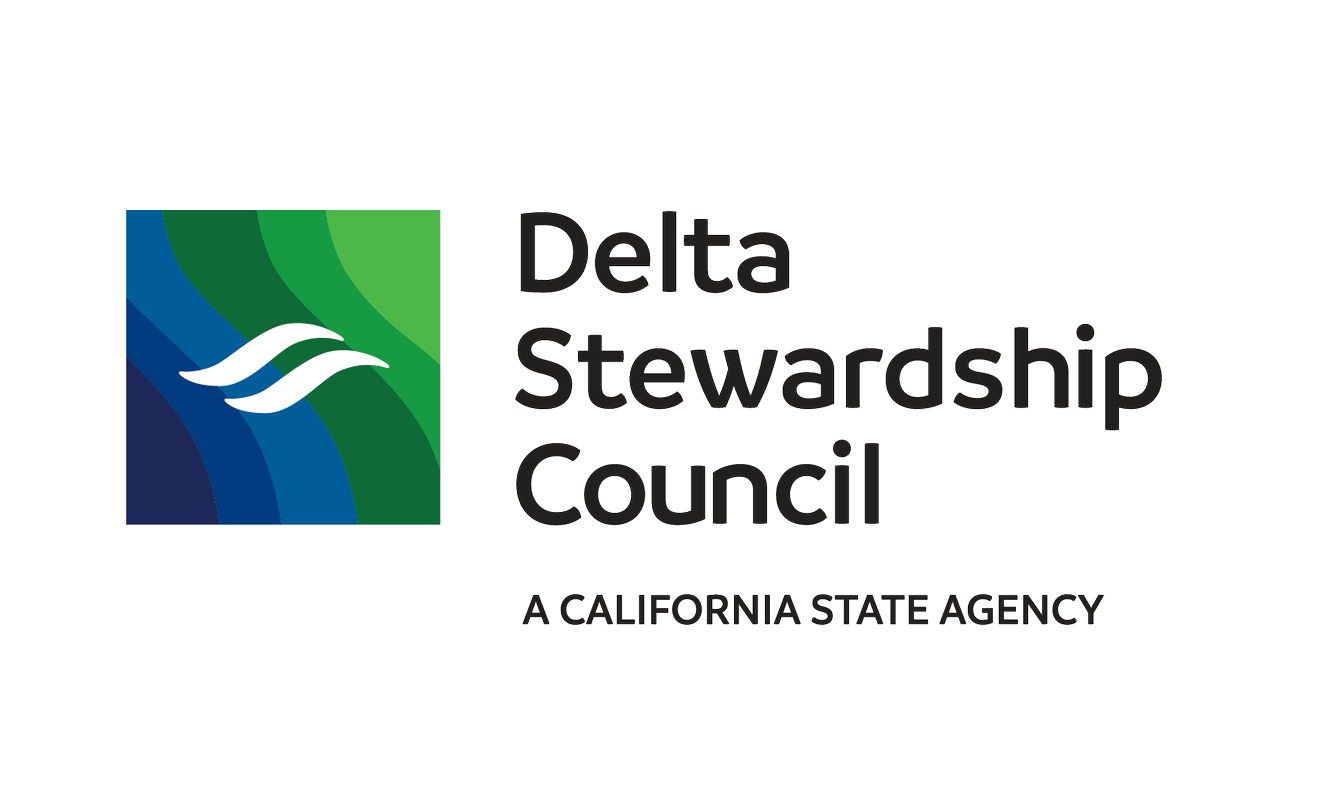
Delta Stewardship Council Logo

The Delta Stewardship Council is a Government of California agency that is tasked with managing the Sacramento–San Joaquin River Delta.

In November 2009, the California Legislature enacted SBX7 1 (Delta Reform Act), one of several bills passed related to water supply reliability, ecosystem health, and the Sacramento-San Joaquin River Delta. The Act, effective on Feb. 3, 2010, called for the creation of the Delta Stewardship Council.

The Council has seven members, who are consulted by a 10-member board of scientists, the Delta Independent Science Board.

The Act required that the Council develop a management plan for the Delta to ensure coordinated action at the federal, state, and local levels. This document is referred to as the Delta Plan.

Part of SBX7 1, Water Code Section 85204 also mandated the Council "establish and oversee a committee of agencies responsible for implementing the Delta Plan" to ensure that the actions of other agencies conform to the Delta Plan's policies.

As stated in the Delta Reform Act, the Council stems from the CALFED Bay-Delta Program. Likewise, the Delta Science Program replaced the CALFED Science Program and the Delta Independent Science Board replaced the CALFED Independent Science Board.
