= August Complex fire =

2020 gigafire in Northern California

- Part of the August 2020 California lightning siege
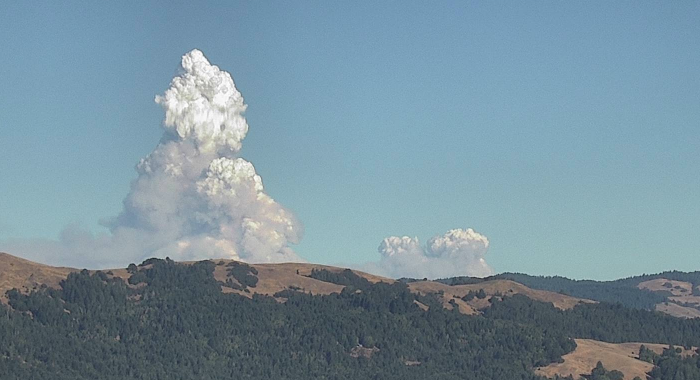
- The smoke plumes of the August Complex Fire.
- Date: August 16, 2020 –; November 12, 2020
- Location: Northern California: Glenn County; Lake County; Mendocino County; Tehama County; Trinity County; Shasta County
- Coordinates: 39.765°N 122.673°W

Statistics
- Total fires: 37
- Total area: 1,032,648 acres (417,898 ha)

Impacts
- Deaths: 1 firefighter
- Injuries: 2 firefighters
- Structures destroyed: 935
- Cost: >$319.8 million (2020 USD)

Ignition
- Cause: Lightning strikes

Map
- Perimeter of August Complex fire
- Location of August Complex fire in Northern California

The August Complex fire was a massive wildfire complex that burned in the Coast Range of Northern California, in Glenn, Lake, Mendocino, Tehama, Trinity, and Shasta Counties. The complex originated as 38 separate fires started by lightning strikes on August 16–17, 2020. Four of the largest fires, the Doe, Tatham, Glade, and Hull fires, had burned together by August 30. On September 9, the Doe Fire, the main fire of the August Complex, surpassed the 2018 Mendocino Complex to become both the single-largest wildfire and the largest fire complex in recorded California history. On September 10, the combined Doe Fire also merged with the Elkhorn Fire (originally a separate incident) and the Hopkins Fire, growing substantially in size. By the time it was extinguished on November 12, the August Complex fire had burned a total of 1,032,648 acres (417,898 ha), or 1,614 square miles (4,180 km^{2}), about 1% of California's 100 million acres of land, an area larger than the state of Rhode Island.

The fire largely burned within the Mendocino National Forest, with portions spilling over to the Shasta-Trinity National Forest and Six Rivers National Forest in the north, as well as private land surrounding the forests. Large areas of the Yolla Bolly-Middle Eel Wilderness and Yuki Wilderness had also been burned. Rugged terrain combined with consistent high winds and record heat complicated firefighting efforts. Although more than 2,900 personnel were deployed to the fire through mid-September, it took almost three months to fully contain the fire. The U.S. Forest Service managed the firefighting effort, with assistance from the California Department of Forestry and Fire Protection.

Due to the immense size of the affected area, the fire was managed as four separate incidents (initially three) within a larger complex. The Doe Fire was defined as the August Complex South Zone and the Elkhorn Fire was defined as the August Complex North Zone, which was later divided into the August Complex Northwest Zone and the August Complex Northeast Zone. The August Complex West Zone was split off from the western portions of the Elkhorn Fire and the Doe Fire, and was managed by Cal Fire.

Due to the remote location of the fire, there were no civilian fatalities, while 935 structures were reported destroyed. However, firefighter Diana Jones was killed, and at least two others were seriously injured.

== Progression ==
=== August ===
On the early morning of August 17, thunderstorms carried northward from the weakening Tropical Storm Fausto moved across Glenn and Mendocino Counties, starting at least 13 fires. By 5:00 pm PDT, the Doe Fire in Glenn County 35 miles (56 km) north of Willows had grown to 100 acres (40 ha), and firefighters had arrived on the scene. Most of the fires were on the Grindstone Ranger District with one on the Covelo Ranger District, ranging in size from 0.5 to 15 acres (0.20 to 6.07 ha). Thunderstorm activity continued for another couple of days, igniting even more wildfires on August 17. On the morning of August 17, the Elkhorn Fire was ignited north of the Doe Fire and east of the Hopkins Fire, near Maple Creek, in Tehama County, which was separate from the August Complex at the time. By 11:00 am PDT on August 17, five fires had been contained, while the Doe Fire had grown to 550 acres (220 ha). In addition, the Box Fire in the Snow Mountain Wilderness reached 20 acres (8.1 ha), and the Rockwell and Pine Kop Fires west of Elk Creek had burned 175 acres (71 ha) and 80 acres (32 ha) respectively. Aided by thunderstorm activity and strong winds, the fires expanded rapidly throughout the day, and more fires were discovered bringing the total to 20. Forest Service officials decided to manage these fires as one incident, the August Complex.

On the morning of August 18, the Doe Fire was estimated at 1,400 acres (570 ha), while the Rockwell and Pine Kop fires were at 800 acres (320 ha) each. The Box Fire had been mostly contained and held at 25 acres (10 ha). Over the next two days, hot dry weather and gusty winds caused the fires to explode in size. Additional fires were discovered, increasing the total to 35. By the morning of August 20, the fires had burned 65,030 acres (26,320 ha) and were advancing downslope to the east. In Glenn County, evacuation orders were issued for parts of Elk Creek, Chrome, Burrows Gap, and Red Mountain, and an evacuation warning for Grindstone Rancheria. In the afternoon, the complex had grown to 116,372 acres (47,094 ha). All of Glenn County west of County Road 306 was placed under an evacuation order. On August 21, due to continued high fire danger, the Mendocino National Forest was temporarily closed to all public access.

By August 24, two additional fires were identified, bringing the total number of new fires to 37 and overall acreage to 177,750 acres (71,930 ha). At this point, some of the larger fires had burned together. The Doe Fire absorbed the Rockwell and Pine Kop fires and was at 153,083 acres (61,950 ha). Firefighting efforts were directed largely at the Doe Fire and at the Tatham and Glade fires, which had burned 7,958 acres (3,220 ha) and 13,888 acres (5,620 ha), respectively. The Hopkins Fire, in the Yolla Bolly-Middle Eel Wilderness further north, had expanded to 2,153 acres (871 ha) and was being monitored for further growth. Ten structures were destroyed, though no deaths or injuries were reported. A total of 433 personnel were assigned to the fire. By August 27, the complex had increased in size to 200,467 acres (81,126 ha). The Doe Fire had expanded to 162,326 acres (65,691 ha) and was 31 percent contained, as firefighters successfully stopped the fire from advancing further east and were building a containment line to the west. There was little containment on the Tatham Fire, now at 8,958 acres (3,625 ha), the Glade Fire, now at 19,684 acres (7,966 ha), and the Hull Fire, which was at 4,885 acres (1,977 ha). On August 28, the complex's total area had increased in size to 212,010 acres (85,800 ha), and was 18 percent contained.

On August 29, the Doe Fire absorbed the Tatham Fire, while the Hopkins Fire had spread east into the Shasta-Trinity National Forest. The Doe Fire was now 52 percent contained, though the complex overall remained at 18 percent, as the other fires continued to spread. A heat wave combined with extremely smoky conditions hampered aircraft operations. On August 30, the Doe Fire also absorbed the Hull and Glade Fires, making the complex essentially one large fire, with the exception of the Hopkins Fire to the north. There were 607 personnel committed to the fire; crews stopped flames from advancing further south towards Lake County, but the fire continued to burn largely uncontrolled to the west. A containment line was being constructed west of the Glade Fire, in the vicinity of the Black Butte River and Bald Mountain.

=== September ===
On September 1, the complex had increased to 242,941 acres (98,315 ha), most of that in the combined Doe-Glade-Tatham-Hull fire, and was 20 percent contained. Firefighters were building containment lines along the west side of the Doe Fire and the south side of the Hull Fire. The Hopkins Fire had expanded to 7,472 acres (3,024 ha) with no containment. One firefighter was confirmed dead in a vehicle accident, and another was injured. Over the next few days, the fire continued to expand rapidly, burning about 20,000 acres (8,100 ha) a day, reaching 298,269 acres (120,705 ha) on September 4. Crews conducted back burns west of the Tatham Fire and northwest of the Hull Fire. Increased fire activity in eastern Mendocino County led to an evacuation warning for the Mendocino National Forest, north of Hull Mountain. On September 5, the National Weather Service issued a Fire Weather Warning due to high winds and unseasonably hot temperatures of 90 to 110 °F (32 to 43 °C). On September 6, aircraft dropped water and retardant on the Hopkins Fire, which had expanded to 15,466 acres (6,259 ha). Back-burns were conducted on the northwest side of the Doe Fire, in anticipation of extreme wind conditions. By September 7, the complex had increased in size to 349,565 acres (141,464 ha) and was 24 percent contained. A total of 1,138 personnel were working on the fire.

On September 8, evacuation orders remained in place for western Glenn County and eastern Mendocino County, and had been expanded to parts of northern Lake County. Strong Diablo winds continued to drive fire activity, but helped clear smoke westward, allowing for increased aircraft operations. During September 8–9, the fires grew rapidly, driven by strong east winds. The complex increased in size to 421,899 acres (170,736 ha), with the Hopkins Fire accounting for 49,887 acres (20,189 ha). On September 9, the Elkhorn Fire merged with the Hopkins Fire, and the combined fire was assigned to the Elkhorn Fire incident and no longer managed as part of the August Complex. On the same day, the southern front of the Elkhorn Fire merged into the northern perimeter of the Doe Fire in southwest Tehama County, but the August Complex and the Elkhorn Fire continued being managed as separate incidents, in order to have the separate incident teams focus on their individual fire areas. On September 10, the August Complex jumped containment lines on the southwest, crossing the Black Butte River and moving into the Yuki Wilderness, triggering evacuations in Lake County, north of Lake Pillsbury. On the morning of September 10, the August Complex was estimated at 471,185 acres (190,682 ha), making it the largest fire complex in California history, surpassing the 2018 Mendocino Complex Fire, which had burned in the southern part of the Mendocino National Forest.

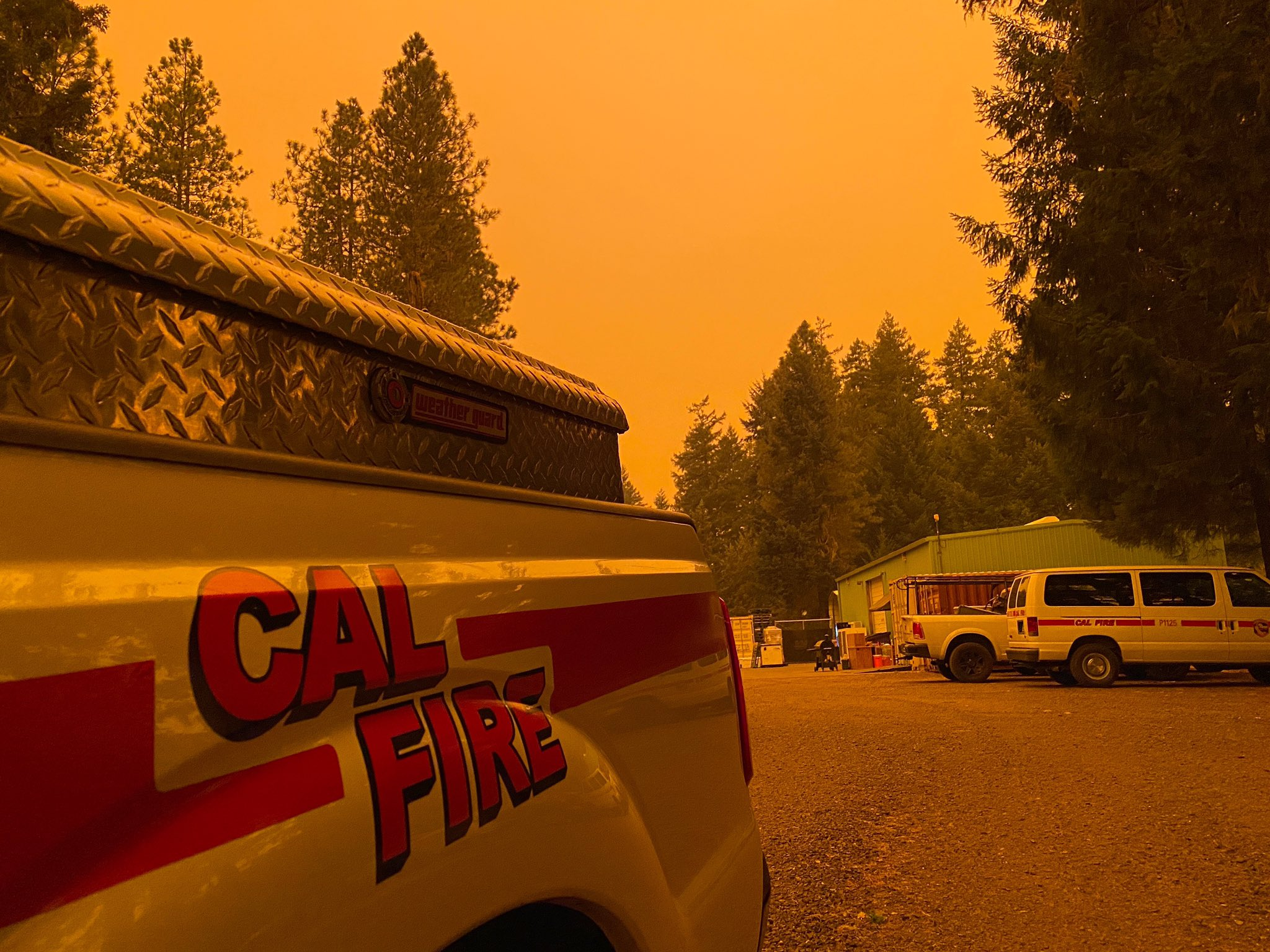
Smoke from the August Complex turned the sky orange in Willits, as seen on September 8

On September 10, the combined Elkhorn and Hopkins Fires were being managed jointly as the Elkhorn Fire, which had burned 255,309 acres (103,320 ha). The fire rapidly advanced into the Six Rivers National Forest, jumping the canyons of the Mad River and North Fork Eel River, before crossing the Eel River south of Alderpoint. Evacuations were ordered in Humboldt County from Bridgeville south to Fort Seward and Alderpoint, while areas from there west to U.S. Highway 101 received an evacuation advisory.

On the evening of September 10, the August Complex and Elkhorn fires had merged into a single, massive wildfire with an area of 726,000 acres (294,000 ha), which expanded to 746,607 acres (302,141 ha) within a couple of hours. On the morning of September 11, the Forest Service was continuing to manage the two fires as separate incidents within the larger complex, due to the immense size of the complex's burn area. The Doe Fire in the August Complex was officially referred to as the "August Complex South Zone", which was 491,446 acres (198,881 ha) and 25 percent contained, while the Elkhorn Fire was being managed as the "August Complex North Zone", which was still at 255,309 acres (103,320 ha) and 27 percent contained, giving the overall complex an area of 746,755 acres (302,201 ha) and 25 percent containment. The western portion of the Elkhorn Fire was further designated as the "August Complex West Zone", which was managed by CAL FIRE.

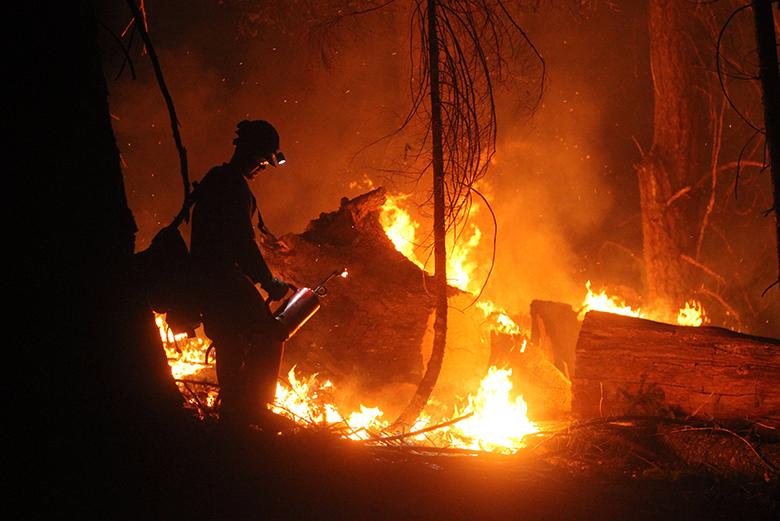
Fighting the August Complex fire near Ruth on September 22

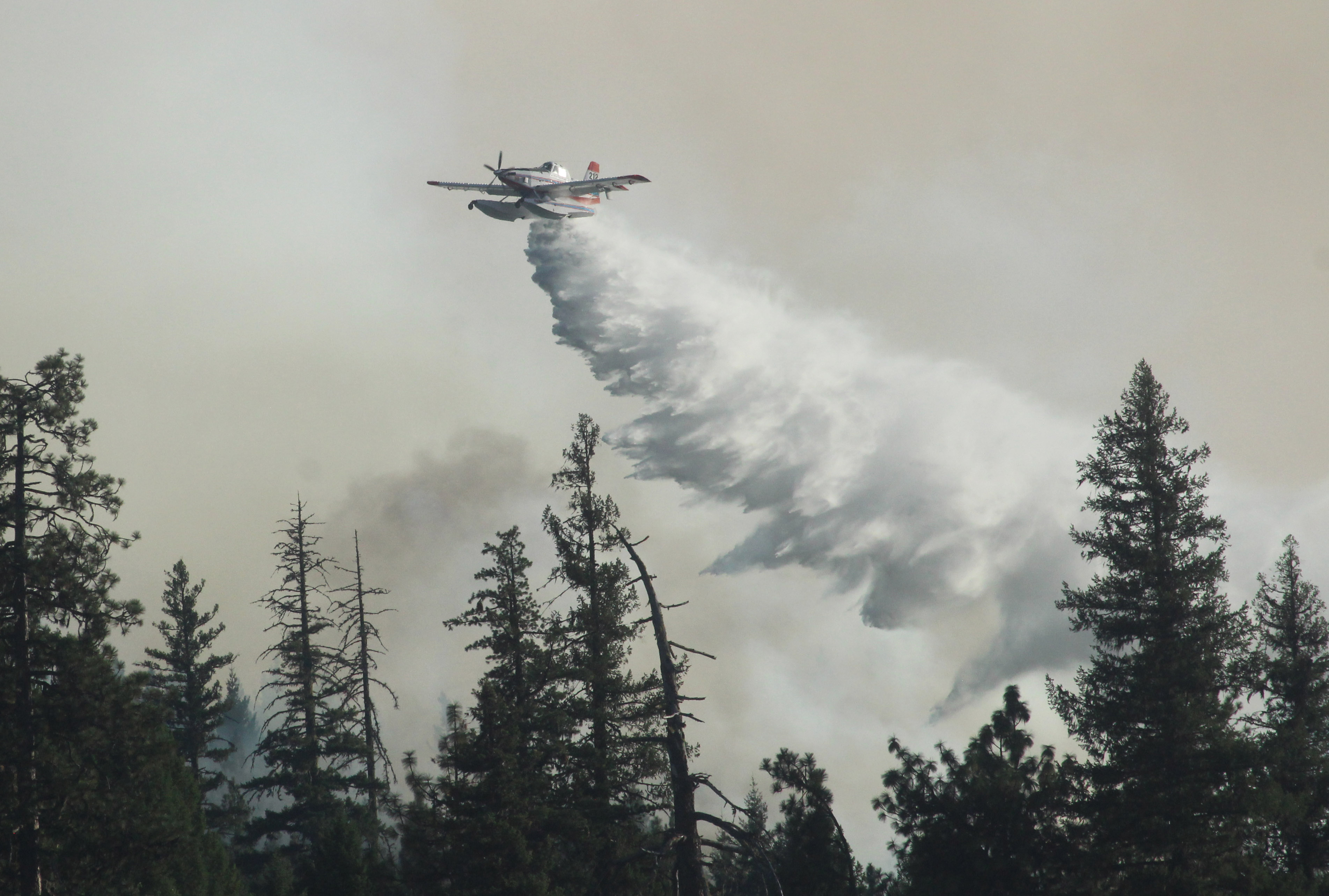
An AT-802 participates in containment efforts in the North Zone on September 25

On September 11, the southwestern flank of the South Zone continued pushing further west into Mendocino County. An evacuation order was issued for areas east of Covelo. Due to the rapid fire spread and thick smoke in the area, officials had trouble estimating the actual size of the fire. On September 13, the fire was thought to have reached 877,477 acres (355,102 ha). By September 15, the burn area had been revised to 794,801 acres (321,645 ha), as better mapping data became available. Most firefighting activity was concentrated in the Lake Pillsbury area on the South Zone, in an effort to stop the fire from advancing further west. Back-burns and mop up operations were continued on the north and east perimeters to strengthen the fire lines there. At this time the fire was 30 percent contained. On the North Zone, the fire continued advancing north, jumping the South Fork Trinity River and advancing towards State Route 36. Firefighters were working to save homes around the Ruth Lake area.

On September 16, it was reported that 35 structures were destroyed, and 400 were still threatened. On the South Zone, the fire continued spreading through the Yuki Wilderness and Sanhedrin Wilderness. On the North Zone, firefighting efforts were focused on stopping the advance north of the South Fork Trinity River. On September 18, evacuations were lifted in the Glenn County portion of the Mendocino National Forest, as the eastern flank of the fire was almost fully contained. On September 19, some evacuations in Mendocino County were also downgraded to an evacuation warning. Firefighters conducted back-burns west and northwest of Lake Pillsbury. The entire August Complex was at 832,891 acres (337,059 ha) and was 31 percent contained, with the fire spreading on its southwestern flank.

By September 21, a significant portion of the large, previously-unburned section of the Yolla Bolly-Middle Eel Wilderness between the North and South Zones had been burned over. In Trinity County, evacuation orders were in effect for the communities of Ruth, Forest Glen, Post Mountain, and Trinity Pines, as the North Zone continued advancing towards State Route 36. Additional crews were sent in an effort to prevent the fire from crossing the highway.

On September 24, the North Zone was still holding south of State Route 36, in part due to back burning operations. However, the highway was closed to civilian traffic. On the South Zone, firefighters had made considerable progress halting the advance near Lake Pillsbury. On the West Zone, the fire continued to threaten Humboldt County. More than 2,000 personnel were assigned to the West Zone at this time. On September 24, members of the California National Guard were also deployed to the West Zone. The entire August Complex was at 862,733 acres (349,136 ha) and 38 percent contained.

September 28 saw increased fire activity on the North Zone, as the onset of a heatwave and Diablo winds drove the flames. The fire jumped north of State Route 36 and traveled rapidly along the South Fork Trinity River canyon. It also jumped west across Ruth Lake, burning towards the upper Van Duzen River drainage and Zenia. High winds blew embers as far as 8 miles (13 km) ahead of the active fire front. Structures and power lines were reported destroyed in the Ruth Lake and Hettenshaw Valley areas. Evacuation orders were issued in Trinity County from Ruth Lake and Mad River west to the Humboldt County line. Evacuation warnings were also issued for Humboldt County from Alderpoint east to the Trinity County line. On the South Zone, the fire held within containment lines at Lake Pillsbury, but evacuation orders remained in place in nearby areas of Mendocino and Lake Counties. On September 29, the entire August Complex had grown to 938,044 acres (379,613 ha), and was 43 percent contained.

=== October ===
On October 1, the August Complex had grown to 955,513 acres (386,682 ha), with containment increasing to 51 percent. On October 5, the August Complex had grown to 1,002,097 acres (405,534 ha), with containment at 54 percent, with the majority of the growth coming from the northwestern and northeastern flanks of the fire. This made the August Complex the first "gigafire" (a fire spanning over a million acres) in the modern history of California. Due to an ongoing La Niña event, California got less rainfall than usual, and the rainy season started later than would typically be seen in October. This made difficult conditions for firefighters and extended the fire season.

=== November ===
After a couple of small rain events and favorable weather, firefighters and aircraft were able contain most of the fire by mid-November, with over 95% containment reported on November 9. Trinity County Environmental Health officials warned that the fire could potentially have contaminated ground and surface water in certain areas affected by the fire. They warned not to drink water from the area, noting that boiling water does not remove contaminants. On November 12, the Forest Service reported that the August Complex had finally reached 100% containment, with the combined incident management being disbanded that same day.

== Growth and containment ==
Fire containment status Gray: contained; Red: active; %: percent contained;
Date	Area burned acres (km^{2})	Containment
Aug 18	10,225 (41)	
Aug 19	70,030 (283)	
Aug 20	116,372 (471)	
Aug 24	177,082 (717)	
Aug 27	200,467 (811)	
Aug 28	212,010 (858)	
Aug 29	215,588 (872)	
Aug 30	221,284 (896)	
Aug 31	236,288 (956)	
Sep 1	242,941 (983)	
Sep 2	261,204 (1,057)	
Sep 3	287,106 (1,163)	
Sep 4	298,269 (1,207)	
Sep 5	305,673 (1,237)	
Sep 6	325,172 (1,316)	
Sep 7	349,565 (1,415)	
Sep 8	356,312 (1,442)	
Sep 9	421,899 (1,707)	
Sep 10	471,185 (1,907)	
Sep 11*	746,755 (3,022)	
Sep 14	755,603 (3,058)	
Sep 15	794,801 (3,216)	
Sep 16	796,651 (3,224)	
Sep 18	824,118 (3,335)	
Sep 19	832,891 (3,371)	
Sep 20	836,871 (3,387)	
Sep 21	846,752 (3,427)	
Sep 22	846,898 (3,427)	
Sep 23	859,966 (3,480)	
Sep 24	862,733 (3,491)	
Sep 25	867,335 (3,510)	
Sep 26	870,200 (3,522)	
Sep 27	873,079 (3,533)	
Sep 28	878,470 (3,555)	
Sep 29	938,044 (3,796)	
Sep 30	949,055 (3,841)	
Oct 1	955,513 (3,867)	
Oct 2	970,563 (3,928)	
Oct 3	979,386 (3,963)	
Oct 4	987,654 (3,997)	
Oct 5	1,013,097 (4,100)	
Oct 10	1,026,947 (4,156)	
Oct 20	1,032,264 (4,177)	
Nov 12	1,032,648 (4,179)	

*Note: The large jump in area burned on September 11 was due to a merger with Elkhorn fire late on September 10.

== See also ==
- 2020 California wildfires
- List of California wildfires
