= 2020 Western United States wildfire season =

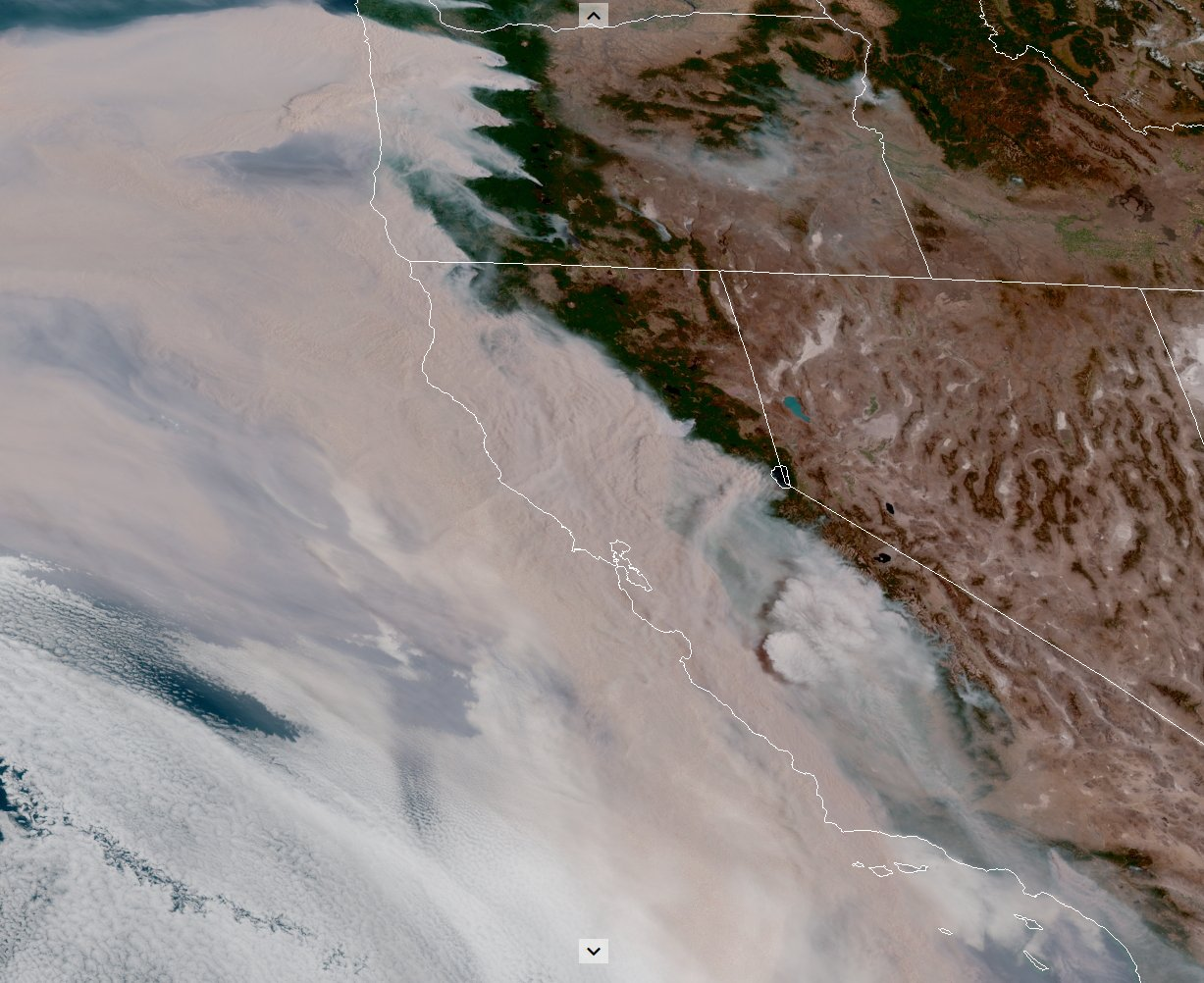
- Satellite image of the smoke from the wildfires burning in California and Oregon on September 9, 2020
- Date: July 24, 2020 – December 31, 2020
- Location: Western United States

Statistics
- Total fires: 100+
- Total area: 10,200,000 acres (4,100,000 ha)

Impacts
- Deaths: 47 direct (32 in California, 11 in Oregon, 1 in Washington, 1 in Arizona, 2 in Colorado) 1,200 to 3,000 indirect (caused by the adverse effects of smoke inhalation)
- Injuries: Unknown
- Structures destroyed: 13,887
- Cost: >$19.884 billion (2020 USD)

The Western United States experienced a series of major wildfires in 2020. Severe August thunderstorms ignited numerous wildfires across California, Oregon, and Washington, followed in early September by additional ignitions across the West Coast. Fanned by strong, gusty winds and fueled by hot, dry terrains, many of the fires exploded and coalesced into record-breaking megafires, burning more than 10.2 million acres (41,000 square kilometres) of land, mobilizing tens of thousands of firefighters, razing over ten thousand buildings, and killing at least 37 people. The fires caused over $19.884 billion (2020 USD) in damages, including $16.5 billion in property damage and $3.384 billion in fire suppression costs. Climate change and poor forest management practices contributed to the severity of the wildfires.

== Background ==
=== Fire, environment, and cultural shift ===
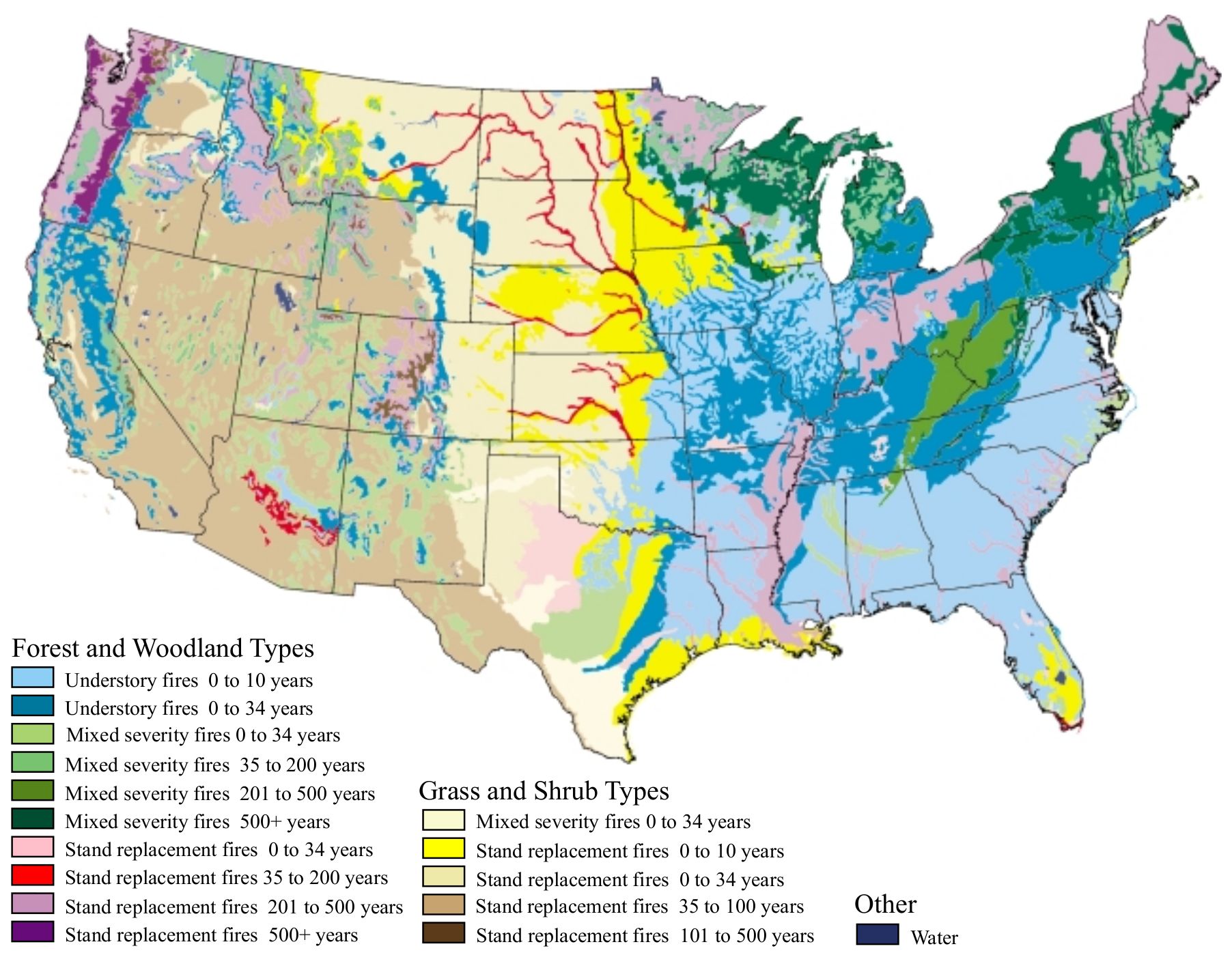
Fire regimes of United States vegetation

Save for areas along the Pacific coast and mountain ridgetops, North America tends to be wetter in the east and drier in the west. This creates ideal conditions in the West for lightning sparked and wind driven storms to spread large-scale, seasonal wildfires. Human societies practicing cultural burns developed in these conditions. Various Indigenous controlled fire practices, as well as their adoption by settlers, were curtailed and outlawed during the European colonization of the Americas, culminating with the modern fire suppression era, signified by the Weeks Act of 1911, which formalized paradigmatic changes in ecosystem priorities and management. Land was protected from fire, and vegetation accumulated near settlements, increasing the risk of explosive, smoky conflagrations.

Many indigenous tribes, including the Karuk, have passed down cultural memories of adaptations to fire-prone ecosystems, including cultural burning. In the last few decades, these have been acknowledged by the United States Forest Service, NOAA, and other agencies in American colonial nations.

While lightning sparked ignitions are typical of fire-prone ecosystems, higher human population and increased development in the wildland–urban interface has increased accidental and intentional sparking of destructive fires.

=== Record hemispheric heat ===
The Northern Hemisphere January–August land and ocean surface temperature tied with 2016 as the warmest such period since global records began in 1880. The Southern Hemisphere had its third-warmest such period (tied with 2017) on record, behind 2016 and 2019.

— United States National Oceanic and Atmospheric Administration, September 14, 2020

Year-to-date (through September 8, 2020) animation of extent and intensity of drought in the United States maintained by the University of Nebraska–Lincoln

Record dry weather struck the Western United States in late 2019, extending all the way through the winter of 2020. The lack of precipitation prompted concerns from state governments and the press. On March 22, a state of emergency was declared by California Governor Gavin Newsom due to a mass die-off of trees throughout the state, potentially increasing the risk of wildfire. Oregon officially declared the start of their wildfire season that same month. Despite light rain in late March and April, severe drought conditions persisted, and were predicted to last late into the year, due to a delayed wet season. After fires began in Washington in April, several more fires occurred throughout the West Coast, prompting burn ban restrictions in Washington and Oregon, come July.

=== Year-to-date wildfire figures ===
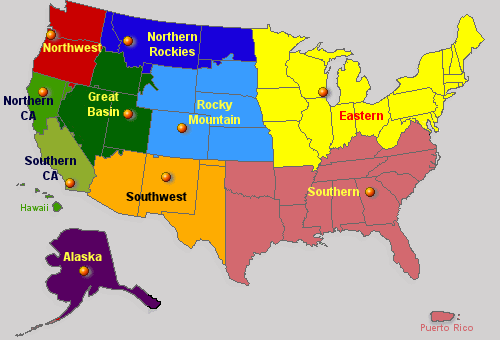
National Interagency Fire Center Geographic Area Coordination Centers

United States agencies stationed at the National Interagency Fire Center in Idaho maintain a "National Large Incident Year-to-Date Report" on wildfires, delineating 10 sub-national areas, aggregating the regional and national totals of burn size, fire suppression cost, and razed structure count, among other data. As of October 21, "Coordination Centers" of each geography report the following:

Note: Check primary sources for up-to-date statistics. This data is not final and may contain duplicate reports until the data is finalized around January 2021.

Coordination Center	Acres	Hectares	Suppression Costs	Structures Destroyed
Alaska Interagency	171,045.7	69,219.7	$14,837,241.00	8
Northwest Area	1,930,877.2	781,398.3	$414,535,531.13	4,472
Northern California Area	4,058,314.2	1,642,341.5	$1,388,359,480.14	9,747
Southern California Area	1,318,498.5	533,577.4	$921,427,069.00	1,857
Northern Rockies	368,164.6	148,990.9	$75,698,682.00	222
Great Basin	926,042.5	374,756.1	$251,845,657.39	275
Southwest Area	1,047,410.6	423,872.0	$204,076,181.96	64
Rocky Mountain Area	1,011,332.6	409,271.8	$343,972,034.34	1,140
Eastern Area	14,989.8	6,066.2	$631,398.58	24
Southern Area	2,892,799.1	1,170,674.3	$15,526,190.92	324
Totals (Note: Year-to-date totals as of December 30, 2020)	13,739,474.8	5,560,168.2	$3,630,909,466.46	18,133

== Timeline of events ==
=== Initial ignitions and weather conditions ===
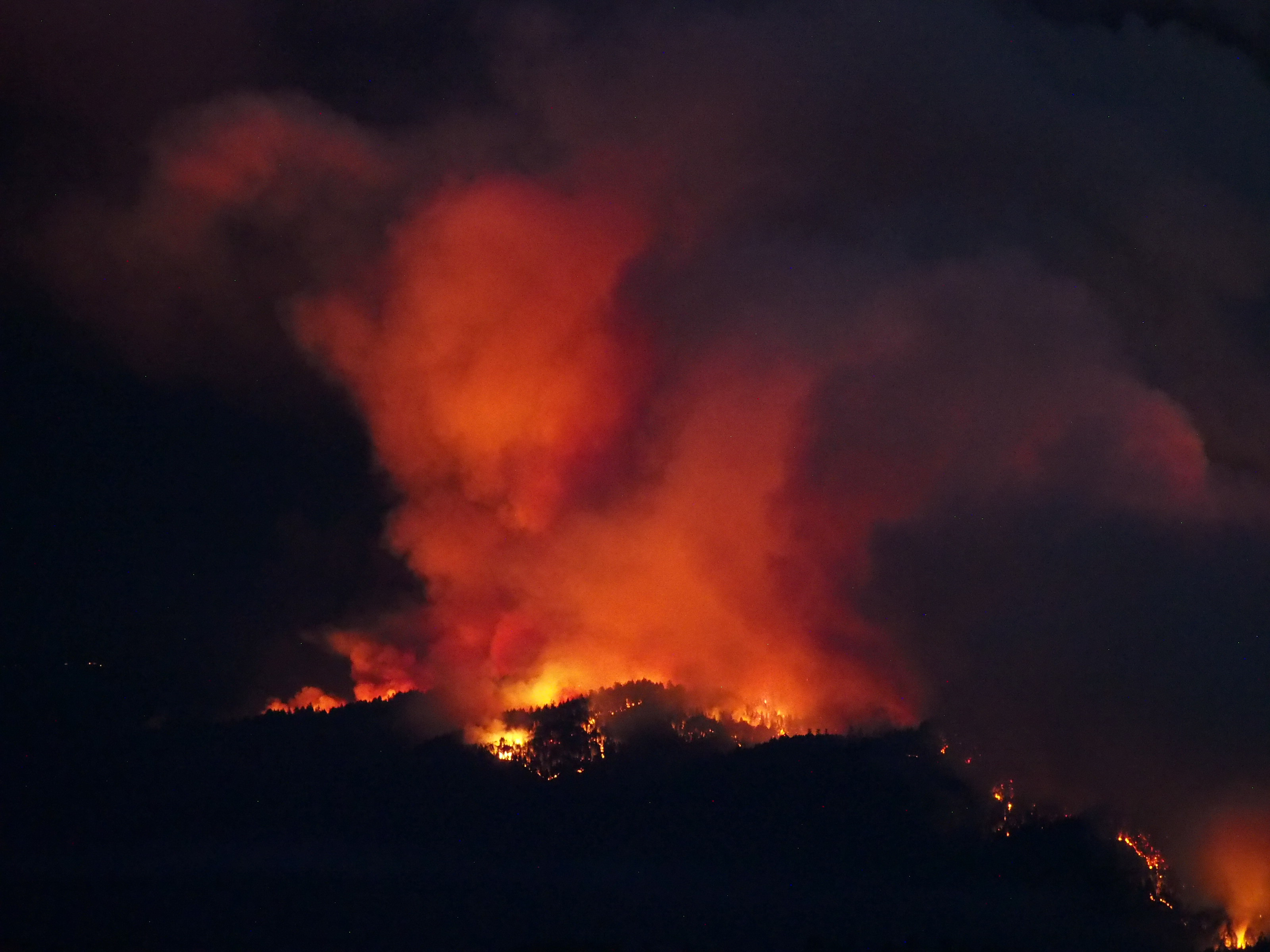
The CZU Lightning Complex fires were sparked by lightning in mid-August

April saw the beginning of wildfires in the west coast, as Washington experienced two fires: the Stanwood Bryant Fire in Snohomish County (70 acres (28 ha)) and the Porter Creek Fire in Whatcom County (80 acres (32 ha)). The Oregon Department of Forestry declared fire season beginning July 5, 2020, signaling the end of unregulated debris burning outdoors, a major cause of wildfires.

Between July 16 and 30, the Washington State Department of Natural Resources (DNR) and many county governments – including Mason, Thurston, King, Pierce and Whatcom Counties – issued fire safety burn bans due to elevated risk of uncontrolled fires. In late July, a brush fire in Chelan County, the Colockum Fire, burned at least 3,337 acres (1,350 ha) and caused homes to be evacuated. A fire on the Colville Reservation near Nespelem called the Greenhouse Fire burned at least 5,146 acres (2,083 ha) and caused the evacuation of the Colville Tribal Corrections Facility and other structures.

Between August 14 and 16, Northern California was subjected to record-breaking warm temperatures, due to anomalously strong high pressure over the region. Early on August 15, the National Weather Service for San Francisco issued a Fire Weather Watch highlighting the risk of wildfire starts due to the combination of lightning risk due to moist, unstable air aloft, dry fuels, and hot temperatures near the surface. Later that day, the Fire Weather Watch was upgraded to a Red Flag Warning, noting the risk of abundant lightning already apparent as the storms moved toward the region from the south.

In mid-August, the remnants of Tropical Storm Fausto interacted with the jet stream, resulting in a large plume of moisture moving northward towards the West Coast of the U.S., triggering a massive siege of lightning storms in Northern California, and setting the conditions for wildfires elsewhere. Due to abnormal wind patterns, this plume streamed from up to 1,000 miles (1,609 km) off the coast of the Baja Peninsula into Northern California. This moisture then interacted with a high-pressure ridge situated over Nevada that was bringing a long-track heat wave to much of California and the West. These colliding weather systems then created excessive atmospheric instability that generated massive thunderstorms throughout much of Northern and Central California. Multiple places also experienced Midwest-style convective "heat bursts"–in which rapid collapse of thunderstorm updrafts caused air parcels aloft to plunge to the surface and warm to extreme levels, with one location near Travis Air Force Base going from around 80 to 100 °F (27 to 38 °C) in nearly 1–2 hours. Additionally, much of these storms were only accompanied with dry lightning and produced little to no rain, making conditions very favorable for wildfires to spark and spread rapidly.

As a result of the fires, on August 19, Governors Kate Brown and Jay Inslee declared a state of emergency for Oregon and Washington respectively.

=== Growth of fires ===
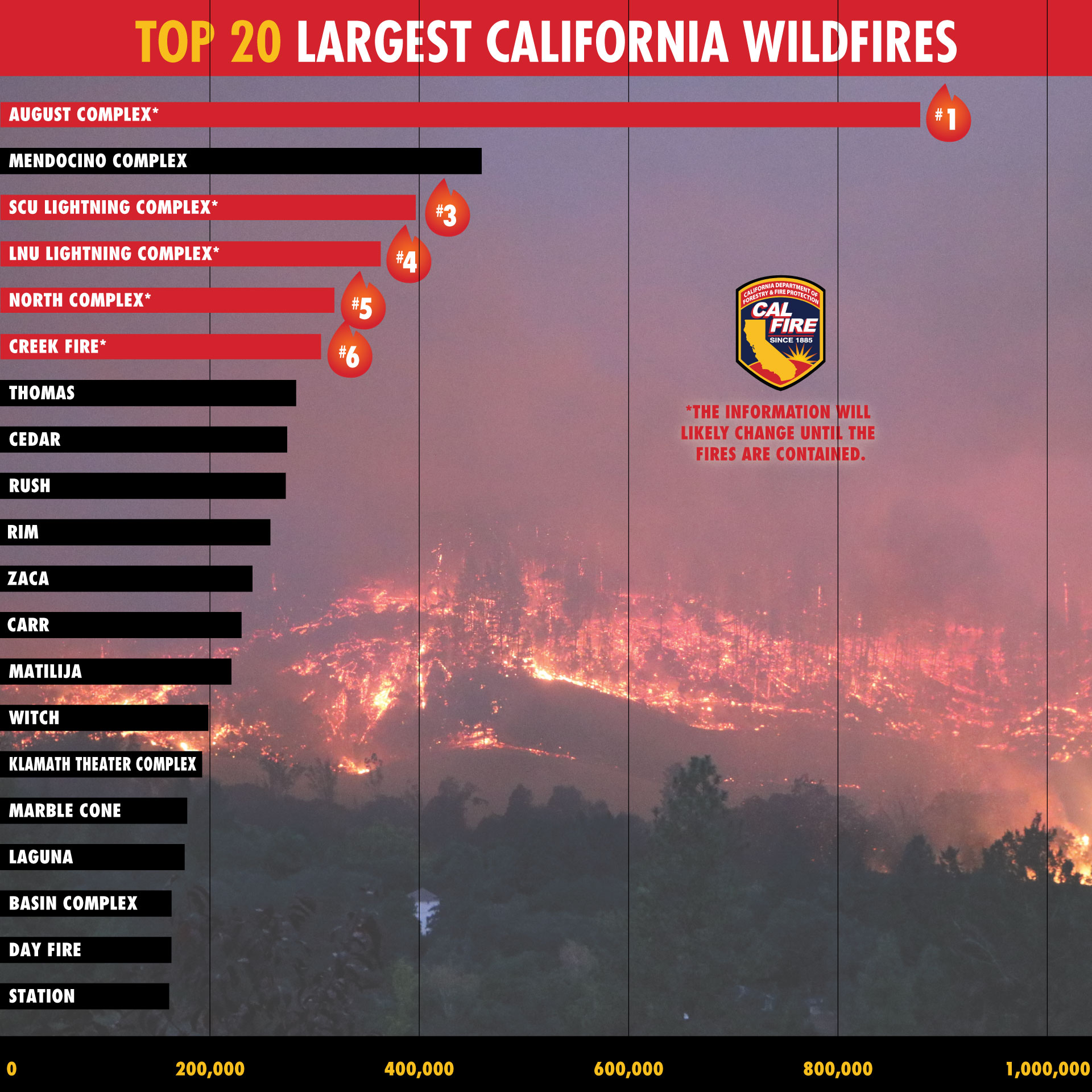
Six of the twenty largest wildfires in California history were part of the 2020 wildfire season. Five of the new wildfires ranking in the top 10 were all a part of the August 2020 lightning fires.

By August 20, the Palmer Fire near Oroville, Washington – which started August 18 – had reached 13,000 acres (5,300 ha) and forced evacuation of up to 85 homes. The largest of the fires in the Olympics reached 2.4 acres (0.97 ha) by August 20.

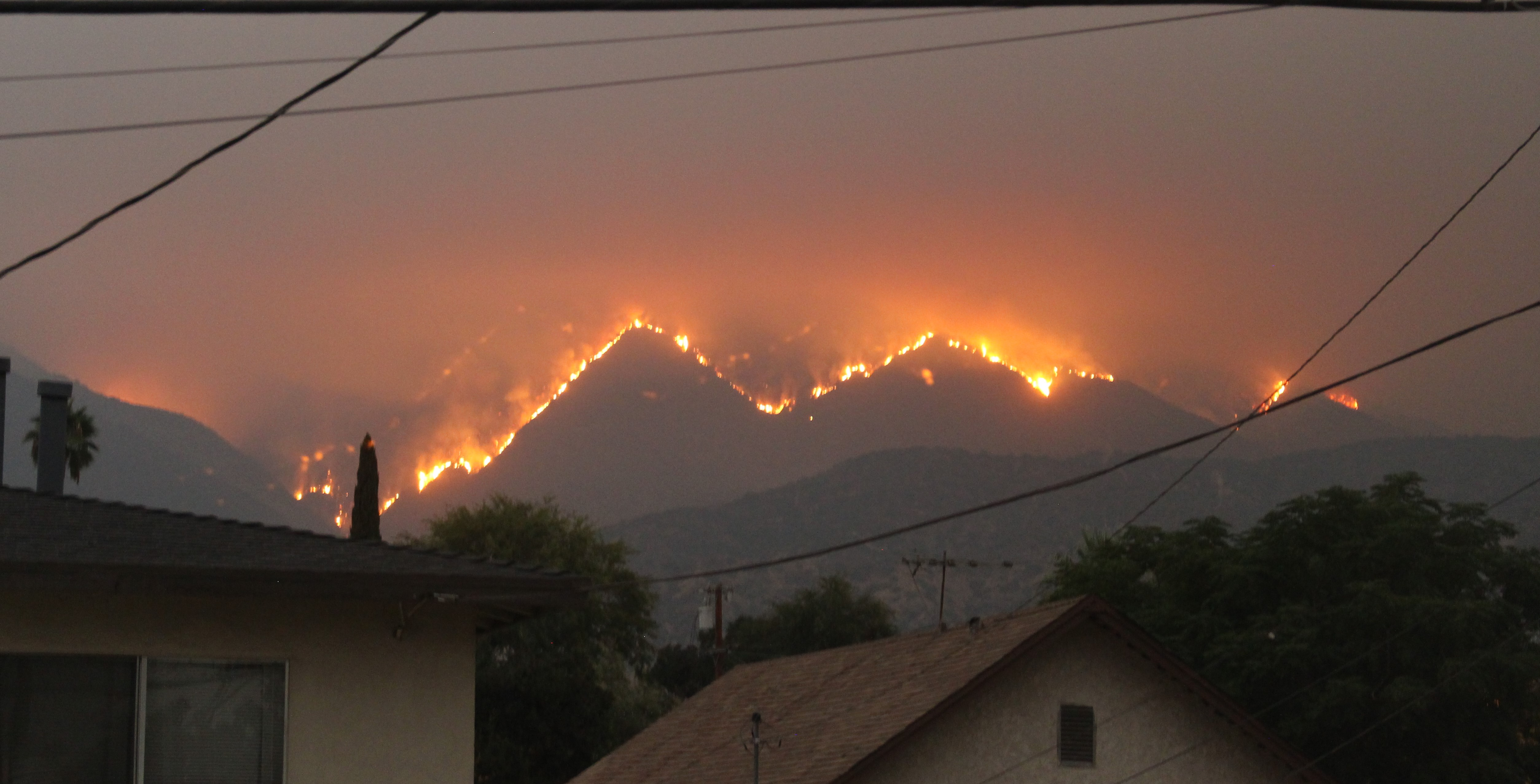
View of the Bobcat Fire from a kitchen window in Monrovia, California

The Evans Canyon Fire, a few miles north of Naches, began around August 31 and expanded to tens of thousands of acres, shut down Washington State Route 821 in the Yakima River Canyon, burned several homes and caused hundreds of families to evacuate, and caused unhealthy air quality in Yakima County. By September 6, it had burned almost 76,000 acres (31,000 ha).

The August 2020 lightning fires include three of the largest wildfires in the recorded history of California: the SCU Lightning Complex, the August Complex, and the LNU Lightning Complex. On September 10, 2020, the August Complex became the single-largest wildfire in the recorded history of California, reaching a total area burned of 471,185 acres (1,907 km^{2}). Then, on September 11, it merged with the Elkhorn Fire, another massive wildfire of 255,039 acres (1,032 km^{2}), turning the August Complex into a monster wildfire of 746,607 acres (3,021 km^{2}).

In early September 2020, a combination of a record-breaking heat wave, and Diablo and Santa Ana winds sparked more fires and explosively grew active fires, with the August Complex surpassing the 2018 Mendocino Complex to become California's largest recorded wildfire. The North Complex increased in size as the winds fanned it westward, threatening the city of Oroville, and triggering mass evacuations. During the first week in September, the 2020 fire season set a new California record for the most area burned in a year at 2,000,000 acres (810,000 ha). As of September 13, 3,200,000 acres (1,300,000 ha) had burned in the state. On September 5, heat from the Creek Fire generated a large pyrocumulonimbus cloud, described as one of the largest seen in the United States.

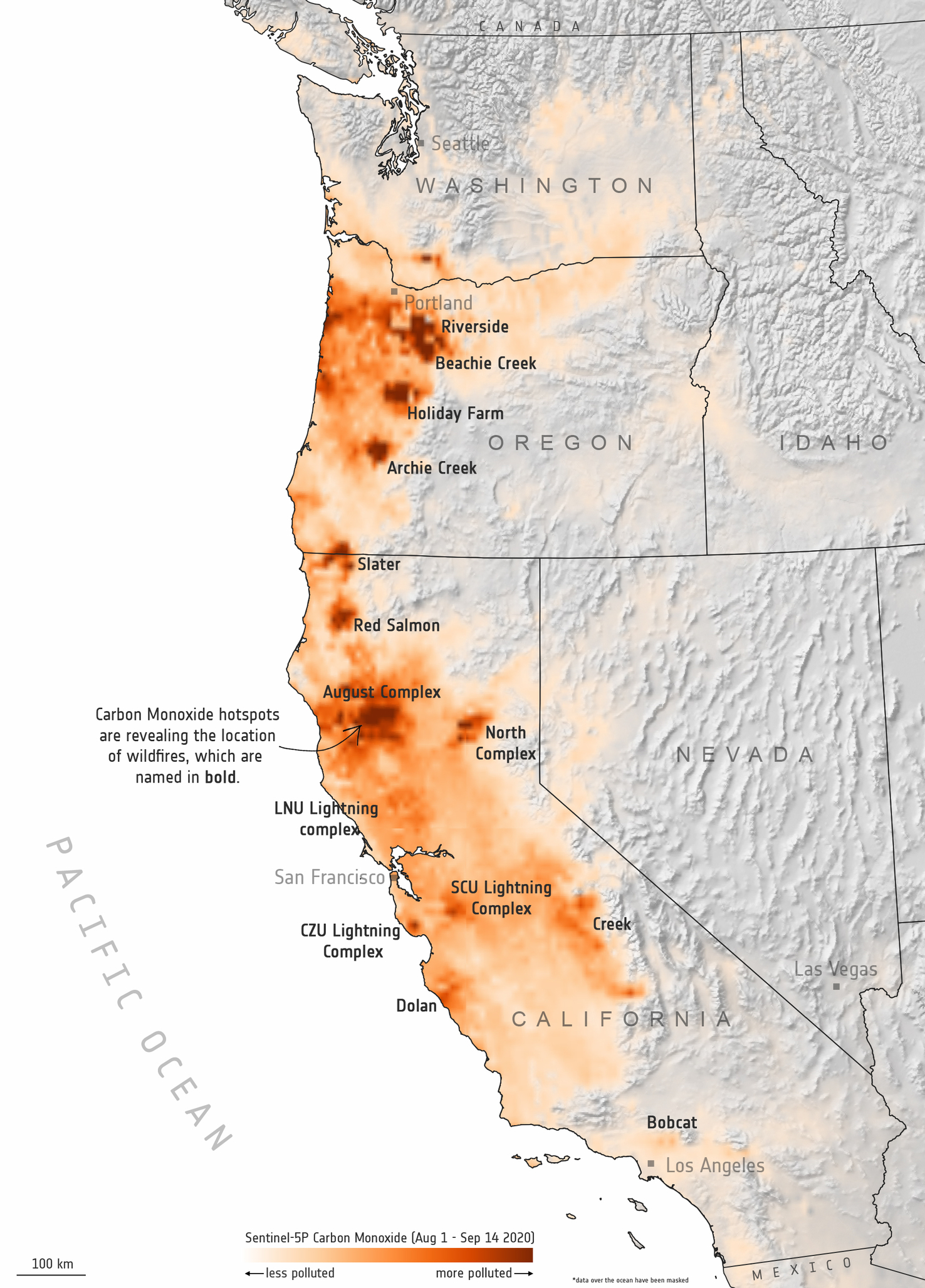
Carbon monoxide hotspots show locations of the wildfires

On September 7, a "historic fire event" with high winds resulted in 80 fires and nearly 300,000 acres (120,000 ha) burned in a day. Malden, in the Palouse Country of Eastern Washington, was mostly destroyed by one of the fires. By the evening of September 8, the Cold Springs Canyon and adjacent Pearl Hill Fires had burned over 337,000 acres (136,000 ha) and neither was more than 10% contained. Smoke blanketed the Seattle area on September 8 and caused unhealthy air conditions throughout the Puget Sound region, and affected Southwest British Columbia.

On September 8, 2020, in Salem, Oregon, dark red skies as a result of smoke were visible beginning in the late morning. On September 9, 2020, San Francisco and Eureka, California were similarly affected, with dark orange skies reported.

The cities of Phoenix and Talent in Oregon were substantially destroyed by the Almeda Drive Fire. State-wide, at least 23 people have been killed. On September 11, authorities said they were preparing for a mass fatality incident. As of September 11, 600 homes and 100 commercial buildings have been destroyed by the Almeda Drive Fire. Officials stated that the Almeda Drive Fire was human-caused. On September 11, a man was arrested for arson, for allegedly starting a fire that destroyed multiple homes in Phoenix and merged with the Almeda Drive Fire. A separate criminal investigation into the origin point of the Almeda Drive Fire in Ashland is ongoing.

Around September 11–12, wildfires were starting to encroach upon the Clackamas County suburbs of Portland, Oregon, especially the fast-moving Riverside Fire which had already jumped the nearby community of Estacada, but shifting wind directions kept the fire away from the main Portland area.

Through much of September, at least 8 large wildfires, each of 100,000 acres (400 km^{2}) or more, were burning in Washington and Oregon, with 3 in Washington and 5 in Oregon. This was unprecedented for those two states, which combined only saw a total of 26 large fires from 1997 to 2019. On September 22, 10 large fires, each of at least 100,000 acres, were burning across California, including 5 of the 10 largest wildfires in the state's history.

=== Evacuations ===
The Government of California's video about COVID-19 protocols in place at wildfire evacuation centers

The first evacuations began on September 4, when almost 200 people were airlifted out of the Sierra National Forest due to the rapidly exploding Creek Fire. Then on September 9, most of the southern area of the city of Medford, Oregon was forced to evacuate and almost all of the 80,000 residents living in the city were told to be ready if necessary because of the uncontained Almeda Drive Fire, which was fast encroaching on their city. As of September 11, about 40,000 people in Oregon had been instructed to evacuate, and 500,000, accounting for about 10% of the state's population, had received instructions to prepare for evacuation, being under a Level 1, 2, or 3 fire evacuation alert.

== List of wildfires ==
The following is a list of fires that burned more than 1,000 acres (405 ha) or produced significant structural damage or casualties.

Name	County	Acres	Start date	Containment date (Note: Containment means that fire crews have established and secured control lines around the fire's perimeter. These lines are artificial barriers, like trenches or cleared vegetation, designed to stop the fire's spread, or natural barriers like rivers. Containment reflects progress in managing the fire but does not necessarily mean the fire is starved of fuel, under control, or put out.)	Notes	Ref
Interstate 5	Kings County, California	2,060	May 3	May 7		
PCMS Complex	Las Animas County, Colorado	2,175	May 16	May 21	Unknown Cause	
Cherry Canyon	Las Animas County, Colorado	11,818	May 20	May 27	Lightning-Caused	
Range	San Luis Obispo County, California	5,000	May 27	May 28		
Tabby Canyon	Tooele County, Utah	13,378	May 30	June 2	Caused by exploding target. Merged with North Stansbury Fire on June 1 at 6,848.8 acres.	
Scorpion	Santa Barbara County, California	1,395	May 31	June 1		
Bighorn	Pima County, Arizona	119,987	June 5	July 23	Burned on the Santa Catalina Mountains	
Quail	Solano County, California	1,837	June 6	June 10	3 structures destroyed	
Farm Camp	San Miguel County, New Mexico	22,872	June 6	June 14	Lightning-Caused	
Tadpole	Grant County, New Mexico	11,159	June 6	July 17	Lightning-Caused	
Wood	San Diego County, California	11,000	June 8	June 12	Burned on Camp Pendleton	
India	San Diego County, California	1,100	June 8	June 14	Burned on Camp Pendleton	
Mangum	Coconino County, Arizona	71,450	June 8	July 7	Burned in the Kaibab National Forest	
Soda	San Luis Obispo County, California	1,672	June 10	June 11	2 structures destroyed	
Grant	Sacramento County, California	5,042	June 12	June 17	1 structure damaged	
Bush	Gila County, Maricopa County, Arizona	193,455	June 13	July 6	Human-Caused	
East Canyon	La Plata County, Montezuma County, Colorado	2,905	June 14	June 27	Lightning-Caused	
Vics Peak	Socorro County, New Mexico	14,624	June 15	August 4	Lightning-Caused;burned in the Apache Kid Wilderness	
Walker	Calaveras County, California	1,455	June 16	June 20	2 structures destroyed	
Grade	Tulare County, California	1,050	June 22	June 26		
Brown	White Pine County, Nevada	8,268	June 24	June 30	The cause of the wildfire is still under investigation	
Poeville	Washoe County, Nevada	2,975	June 26	July 6	Led to evacuation of portions of the City of Reno	
Wood Springs 2	Apache County, Arizona	12,861	June 27	July 11	Lightning-Caused; 7 structures destroyed on the Navajo Nation	
Canal	Millard County, Juab County, Utah	78,065	June 27	July 13	Lightning-Caused; destroyed 34 structures; 100% contained on June 27 but escaped containment due to strong winds	
Pass	Merced County, California	2,192	June 28	June 30		
Bena	Kern County, California	2,900	July 1	July 3		
Polles	Gila County, Arizona	628	July 3	July 23	Lightning-Caused; a helicopter supporting firefighting efforts crashed on July 7, taking the life of pilot Bryan Boatman.The incident is under investigation.	
Crews	Santa Clara County, California	5,513	July 5	July 13	1 structure destroyed; 1 damaged; 1 injury. Resulted in evacuations of rural Gilroy.	
Soledad	Los Angeles County, California	1,525	July 5	July 15	1 injury	
Numbers	Douglas County, Nevada	18,380	July 6	July 14	40 buildings destroyed	
Mineral	Fresno County, California	29,667	July 13	July 26	7 structures destroyed	
Coyote	San Benito County, California	1,508	July 15	July 18		
Hog	Lassen County, California	9,564	July 18	August 8	2 structures destroyed	
Gold	Lassen County, California	22,634	July 20	August 8	13 structures destroyed; 5 structures damaged; 2 firefighters injured in burnover	
July Complex 2020	Modoc County, Siskiyou County, California	83,261	July 22	August 7	1 structure destroyed; 3 outbuildings destroyed	
Blue Jay	Mariposa County, Tuolumne County, California	6,922	July 24	November 19	Lightning-sparked	
Red Salmon Complex	Humboldt County, Siskiyou County, Trinity County, California	144,698	July 26	November 23	Originally started as both the Red and Salmon fire (both started by lightning strikes), but have since merged into one fire	
Chikamin	Chelan County, Washington	1,685	July 31	September 24		
Apple	Riverside County, California	33,424	July 31	November 16, 2020	4 structures destroyed; 8 outbuildings destroyed; 4 injuries	
Pond	San Luis Obispo County, California	1,962	August 1	August 8	1 structure destroyed; 1 damaged; 13 outbuildings destroyed	
North	Lassen County, California	6,882	August 2	August 10	6,882 acres in total, of which approximately 4,105 acres burned in Washoe County, Nevada	
Stagecoach	Kern County, California	7,760	August 3	August 16	23 structures destroyed; 4 damaged; 25 outbuildings destroyed; 2 damaged; 1 firefighter fatality	
Neals Hill	Harney County, Oregon	3,391	August 5	August 20	Caused by lightning	
Bumble Bee	Yavapai County, Arizona	2,993	August 7	August 12	Human-Caused	
Wolf	Mariposa County, Tuolumne County, California	2,057	August 11	November 19	Lightning-sparked	
Lake	Los Angeles County, California	31,089	August 12	October 5	Lightning-sparked, 33 structures destroyed; 6 damaged; 21 outbuildings destroyed; 2 injuries	
Ranch 2	Los Angeles County, California	4,237	August 13	October 5	Lightning-sparked	
Hills	Fresno County, California	2,121	August 15	August 24	Lightning-sparked; 1 fatality	
Loyalton	Lassen County, Plumas County, Sierra County, California	47,029	August 15	September 14	Lightning-sparked, Caused National Weather Service to issue first ever Fire Tornado Warning; 5 homes, 6 outbuildings destroyed	
Beach	Mono County, California	3,780	August 16	August 28	Lightning-sparked	
Frog	Crook County, Oregon	4,020	August 16	September 1	Caused by lightning	
Green Ridge	Deschutes County, Oregon	4,338	August 16	September 1	Caused by lightning	
River	Monterey County, California	48,088	August 16	September 4	Lightning-sparked; 30 structures destroyed; 13 structures damaged; 4 injuries	
Dome	San Bernardino County, California	43,273	August 16	September 14	Lightning-sparked, Burned in the Mojave National Preserve	
Indian Creek	Malheur County, Oregon	48,128	August 16	September 16	Caused by lightning	
CZU Lightning Complex	San Mateo County, Santa Cruz County, California	86,509	August 16	September 22	Several lightning-sparked fires burning close together across San Mateo and Santa Cruz Counties; 1,490 structures destroyed; 140 structures damaged; 1 injury; 1 fatality.	
SCU Lightning Complex	Santa Clara County, Alameda County, Contra Costa County, San Joaquin County, Merced County, Stanislaus County, California	396,624	August 16	October 1	Deer Zone, Marsh, Canyon Zone and other surrounding fires combined into one multi-fire incident by CalFire; all believed to have been sparked by an intense and widespread lightning storm; 222 structures destroyed; 26 structures damaged; 6 injuries. It is the third-largest fire complex in California history.	
Beachie Creek	Linn County, Oregon	193,573	August 16	October 28. Merged with the Lionshead Fire and became the Santiam Fire on September 8.		
August Complex	Glenn County, Mendocino County, Lake County, Tehama County, Trinity County, California	1,032,648	August 16	November 12	Lightning strikes started 37 fires, several of which grew to large sizes, especially the Doe Fire; 935 structures destroyed; 2 firefighter injuries; 1 firefighter fatality. It became the largest fire complex in California history and combined with the Elkhorn Fire on September 10.	
Lionshead	Jefferson County, Oregon	204,469	August 16	December 10. Merged into the Beachie Creek Fire and became the Santiam Fire on September 8.		
Rattlesnake	Tulare County, California	8,419	August 16	December 18	Lightning sparked a slow-growing fire in inaccessible terrain.	
Downey Creek	Douglas County, Oregon	2,570	August 16	December 31		
Jones	Nevada County, California	705	August 17	August 28	Lightning sparked, 21 structures destroyed, 3 structures damaged, 7 injuries	
Holser	Ventura County, California	3,000	August 17	September 6		
Sheep	Plumas County, Lassen County, California	29,570	August 17	September 9	Lightning-sparked, 26 structures destroyed, 1 injury	
LNU Lightning Complex	Colusa County, Lake County, Napa County, Sonoma County, Solano County, Yolo County, California	363,220	August 17	October 2	Multi-fire incident that includes the Hennessey Fire (305,651 acres), the Walbridge Fire (55,209 acres), and the Meyers Fire (2,360 acres) sparked by lightning; 1,491 structures destroyed; 232 structures damaged; 5 injuries; 5 fatalities. It is the fourth-largest fire complex in California history.	
Butte/Tehama/Glenn Lightning Complex (Butte Zone)	Butte County, California	19,609	August 17	October 17	Lightning sparked 34 fires throughout Butte County; 14 structures destroyed; 1 structure damaged; 1 injury	
White River	Wasco County, Oregon	17,383	August 17	October 20		
North Complex	Plumas County, Butte County, Yuba County, California	318,935	August 17	December 4	Lightning strikes, includes the Claremont Fire and the Bear Fire; 2,357 structures destroyed, 114 structures damaged; 15 fatalities; 2 injuries; It is the sixth-largest fire complex in California history.	
Salt	Calaveras County, California	1,789	August 18	August 24	Lightning-sparked	
Carmel	Monterey County, California	6,905	August 18	September 4	Lightning-sparked, 73 structures destroyed; 7 structures damaged	
W-5 Cold Springs	Lassen County, Modoc County, California	84,817	August 18	September 14	Lightning-sparked. Fire spread eastward into Washoe County, Nevada.	
Palmer	Okanogan County, Washington	17,988	August 18	December 1		
Laurel	Wheeler County, Oregon	1,257	August 19	September 14		
Woodward	Marin County, California	4,929	August 18	October 1	Lightning-sparked	
Dolan	Monterey County, California	124,924	August 18	December 31	Cause not officially determined; however, a suspect was charged with arson in connection to the fire	
SQF Complex	Tulare County, California	174,178	August 19	January 5	Lightning-sparked, contains the Castle Fire and the Shotgun Fire	
Moc	Tuolumne County, California	2,857	August 20	August 30	Lightning-sparked	
East Fork	Duchesne County, Utah	89,765	August 21	November 5	Lightning-Caused; destroyed 11 structures and merged with the Phinney Lake fire at 10,040 acres	
Moraine	Tulare County, California	1,316	August 21	December 18	Lightning-sparked	
Slink	Mono County, California	26,759	August 29	November 8	Lightning-sparked	
Evans Canyon	Kittitas County, Washington	75,817	August 31	October 31		
Creek	Fresno County, Madera County, California	379,895	September 4	December 24	853 structures destroyed, 64 structures damaged; 29 injuries; 1 fatality	
Valley	San Diego County, California	16,390	September 5	September 24	51 structures destroyed, 11 structures damaged, 2 injuries	
El Dorado	Riverside County, San Bernardino County, California	22,744	September 5	November 18	Sparked by a pyrotechnic device at a gender reveal party. 20 structures destroyed, 4 structures damaged; 13 injuries, 1 fatality	
Cold Springs	Okanogan County, Washington	189,923	September 6	September 30	1 fatality	
Bobcat	Los Angeles County, California	115,796	September 6	October 19	Unknown cause, 170 structures destroyed, 47 structures damaged; 6 Injuries	
Oak	Mendocino County, California	1,100	September 7	September 14	Unknown cause, 25 structures destroyed, 20 structures damaged	
P-515	Jefferson County, Oregon	4,609	September 7	December 10. Merged into the Lionshead Fire on September 8.		
Slater/Devil	Siskiyou County, Del Norte County, California, Josephine County, Oregon	157,229	September 7	November 16	2 fatalities, 1 structure destroyed	
Two Four Two	Klamath County, Oregon	14,473	September 7	October 31		
Brattain	Lake County, Oregon	50,951	September 7	October 31		
Holiday Farm	Lane County, Oregon	173,393	September 7	October 31	1 fatality	
Echo Mountain Complex	Lincoln County, Oregon	2,552	September 7	October 27	293 structures destroyed, 22 structures damaged	
Babb-Maiden/Manning	Spokane County, Washington	18,254	September 7	December 15		
Whitney	Lincoln County, Washington	127,430	September 7	December 18		
Inchelium Complex	Ferry County, Washington	19,399	September 7	September 28		
Pearl Hill	Douglas County, Washington	223,730	September 7	December 15	Started when the Cold Springs fire jumped the Columbia River, then spread quickly due to strong winds and low relative humidity. Destroyed 25 residences and 35 other structures.	
Apple Acres	Chelan County, Washington	5,500	September 7	December 15		
Fork	El Dorado County, California	1,673	September 8	November 9		
South Obenchain	Jackson County, Oregon	32,671	September 8	October 31		
Riverside	Clackamas County, Oregon	138,054	September 8	December 3		
Santiam	Clackamas County, Jefferson County, Linn County, Marion County, Wasco County, Oregon	402,592	September 8	December 10	Includes the Lionshead, Beachie Creek, and P-515 Fires, which merged. 1568+ structures destroyed, 5 deaths	
Big Hollow	Skamania County, Washington	24,995	September 8	December 1		
Almeda Drive	Jackson County, Oregon	3,200	September 8	September 15	2457+ structures destroyed, 3 fatalities	
Chehalem Mountain- Bald Peak	Washington County, Oregon	2,000	September 8	September 14		
Thielsen	Douglas County, Oregon	9,975	September 9	November 16		
Willow	Yuba County, California	1,311	September 9	September 14	41 structures destroyed; 10 structures damaged	
Archie Creek	Douglas County, Oregon	131,542	September 9	November 16		
Bullfrog	Fresno County, California	1,185	September 9	November 9		
Fox	Trinity County, California	2,188	September 14	November 1		
Snow	Riverside County, California	6,254	September 17	November 18		
Glass	Napa County, California Sonoma County, California	67,484	September 28	October 21	1,555 structures destroyed, 282 structures damaged	
Zogg	Shasta County, California	56,338	September 28	October 13	204 structures destroyed, 27 structures damaged; 1 injury, 4 fatalities	
Range	Utah County, Utah	3,496	October 17	November 11	Human-Caused (Cause: Police Target Shooting)	
Silverado	Orange County, California	12,466	October 26	November 7	5 structures destroyed, 9 structures damaged; 2 injuries	
Blue Ridge	Orange County, California	13,694	October 26	November 7	1 structure destroyed, 10 structures damaged	
Laura 2	Orange County, California	2,800	November 17	November 24	40 structures destroyed	
Mountain View	Mono County, California	20,385	November 17	November 27	90 structures destroyed, 8 damaged; 1 fatality	
Airport	Riverside County, California	1,087	December 1	December 12		
Bond	Orange County, California	6,686	December 2	December 10	Started by a house fire; 31 structures destroyed; 21 structures damaged; 2 firefighter injuries	
Sanderson	Riverside County, California	1,933	December 13	December 14		
Creek 5	San Diego County, California	4,276	December 23	December 31	Unknown cause; over 7,000 people evacuated from housing areas on Camp Pendleton	

== Causes ==
=== Fire policy ===
Prior to development, California fires regularly burned significantly more acreage than in recent history. Wildfires have been aggressively suppressed in the last century, resulting in a buildup of fuel, increasing the risk of large uncontrollable fires. There is broad scientific consensus that there should be more controlled burning of forest in California in order to reduce fire risk. Controlled burning is hampered by wildfire litigation models that present wildfires in court cases as the result of careless ignition events while discounting underlying forest conditions. A 2020 ProPublica investigation blamed the culture of Cal Fire, greed on the part of fire suppression contractors, and risk aversion on the part of the U.S. Forest Service from preventing appropriate controlled burns from taking place.

=== Climate change ===
Secretary of California's Natural Resources Agency Wade Crowfoot urges President Trump to not ignore the science on climate change to which Trump responds "I don't think science knows, actually" and "It'll start getting cooler. You just watch."

Climate change has led to increased heat waves and the risk of drought in California, creating the conditions for more frequent and severe wildfires. It has been observed that since the early 1970s, warm-season days in California warmed by ca. 1.4 °C. This significantly increases the atmospheric vapor pressure deficit, the difference between the actual and a maximum moisture content for a certain temperature. Trends simulated by climate models are consistent with human-induced trends. Summer forest-fire area reacts to the vapor pressure deficit exponentially, i.e., warming has grown increasingly impactful.

David Romps, director of the Berkeley Atmospheric Sciences Center summarizes the situation as follows: "To cut to the chase: Were the heat wave and the lightning strikes and the dryness of the vegetation affected by global warming? Absolutely yes. Were they made significantly hotter, more numerous, and drier because of global warming? Yes, likely yes, and yes." Similarly, Friederike Otto, acting director of the University of Oxford Environmental Change Institute states, "There is absolutely no doubt that the extremely high temperatures are higher than they would have been without human-induced climate change. A huge body of attribution literature demonstrates now that climate change is an absolute game-changer when it comes to heat waves, and California won't be the exception." Susan Clark, director of the Sustainability Initiative at the University at Buffalo, states, "This is climate change. This increased intensity and frequency of temperatures and heat waves are part of the projections for the future. [...] There is going to be more morbidity and mortality [from heat.] There are going to be more extremes."

=== Arson ===
In August 2020, a suspect was charged by the Monterey County Sheriff with arson relating to the Dolan Fire; however, this has not been officially determined as the cause of the fire. In April 2021, another suspect, already arrested and charged for the murder of a woman, was charged with arson relating to the Markley Fire, one of the wildfires involving in the LNU Lightning Complex fires; according to authorities, the fire was set to cover up the aforementioned murder. Arson has also been suspected as the cause of the Ranch 2 Fire in Los Angeles County.

== Obstacles to fire control ==
=== Rumors about political extremist involvement ===
In Oregon, rumors spread that Antifa activists allegedly involved in arson and rioting accompanying the nearby George Floyd protests in Portland, Oregon, were deliberately setting fires and were preparing to loot property that was being evacuated. Some residents refused to evacuate based on the rumors. Authorities urged residents to ignore the rumors and follow evacuation orders, noting that firefighters' lives could be endangered rescuing those who remained. QAnon followers participated in spreading the rumors, with one claim that six antifa activists had been arrested for setting fires specifically amplified by "Q", the anonymous person or people behind QAnon.

False rumors also circulated that members of far-right groups such as the Proud Boys had started some of the fires. However, authorities labelled the claims as false, saying that people needed to question claims they found on social media.

There have been a number of arrests for arson surrounding the wildfires, but there is no indication that the incidents were connected to a mass arson campaign, according to multiple law enforcement officers. For example, a man allegedly set fires in Glide, Oregon, after a Douglas Forest Protection Association member refused to give him a ride to town.

=== COVID-19 pandemic ===
The COVID-19 pandemic brought new challenges for firefighters fighting wildfires due to measures intended to reduce the transmission of the disease. The California Department of Forestry and Fire Protection (CAL Fire) implemented new protocols such as wearing face masks and maintaining social distancing while resting, and reducing the number of occupants in the pickup trucks used to transport firefighters.

California relies heavily on inmate firefighters, with incarcerated people making up nearly a quarter of CAL FIRE's total workforce in 2018–2019. Coronavirus measures within the prison system, such as early release and quarantine policies, have reduced the number of inmate firefighters available, necessitating the hiring of additional seasonal firefighters.

== Impacts ==
=== Fire ===
In Oregon, wildfires throughout the whole year, with most occurring in September, charred a record of 1,000,000 acres (4,000 km^{2}), destroying a total of 4,800 structures, including 1,145 homes, and killing 9 people. The towns of Phoenix and Talent were mostly destroyed in the Almeda fire on September 8. In Washington, 2020 wildfires burned 800,000 acres (3,200 km^{2}), with 418 structures, including 195 homes, burned. In California, about 3,300,000 acres (13,000 km^{2}) burned from wildfires in 2020, the highest burned acreage ever recorded in a fire season. About 2,100,000 acres (8,500 km^{2}) burned in the August lighting wildfires and 1,000,000 acres (4,000 km^{2}) more in September. 4,200 structures were destroyed the whole year in California, and 25 people were killed.

=== Smoke and air pollution ===
The fires resulted in worsened air pollution across much of the western U.S. and Canada, from Los Angeles to British Columbia. Alaska Airlines suspended its flights from Portland, Oregon, and Spokane, Washington, due to poor air quality. Some cities in Oregon recorded air quality readings of over 500 on the AQI scale, while readings of over 200 were recorded in major cities. Smoke from the fires were carried to the East Coast and Europe, causing yellowed skies but having little impact on air quality.

The heavy smoke had resulted in several smoke-related incidents. In California, for example, a San Francisco resident was hiking through Yosemite National Park on September 5 when suddenly the sky turned a dark, ugly color and the temperature dropped greatly, reminiscent of a thunderstorm. Ash and smoke started falling, and this erratic weather was caused by the nearby Creek Fire. In another incident, on September 14, an Oakland A's player was at a game at the Seattle Mariners' stadium, when suddenly in the middle of the game he started gasping for air.

It is estimated that as many as 1,200 to 3,000 indirect deaths have been caused by the adverse effects of smoke inhalation.

Red skies appeared over many cities over the West Coast, including on Orange Skies Day, due to smoke from the wildfires blocking lighter colors, created from light infraction. Due to the complex oxidative chemistry occurring during the transport of wildfire smoke in the atmosphere, the toxicity of emissions was suggested to increase over time.

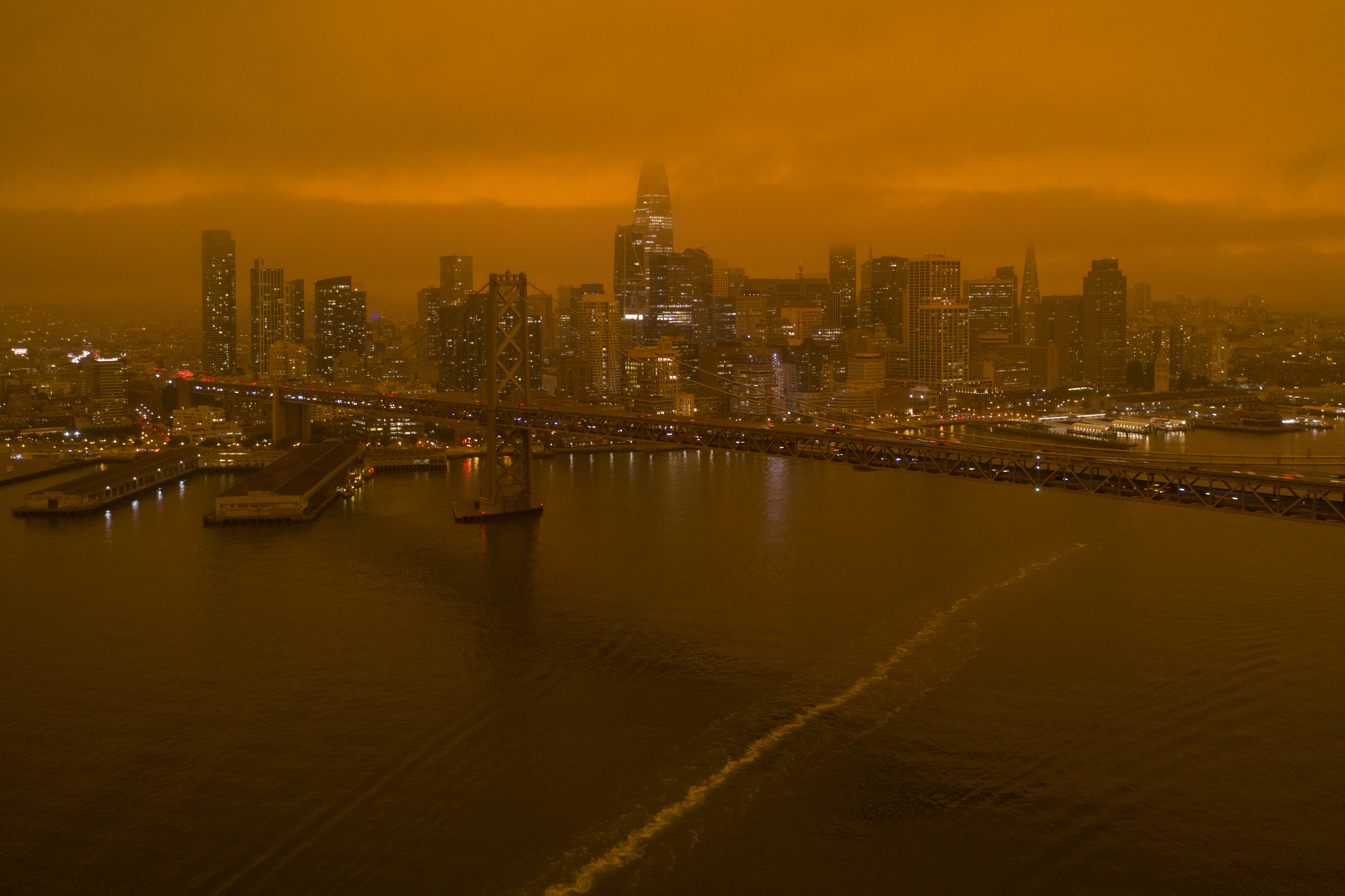
Smoke from the North Complex Fire settles over San Francisco, turning the midday sky a dark orange on September 9

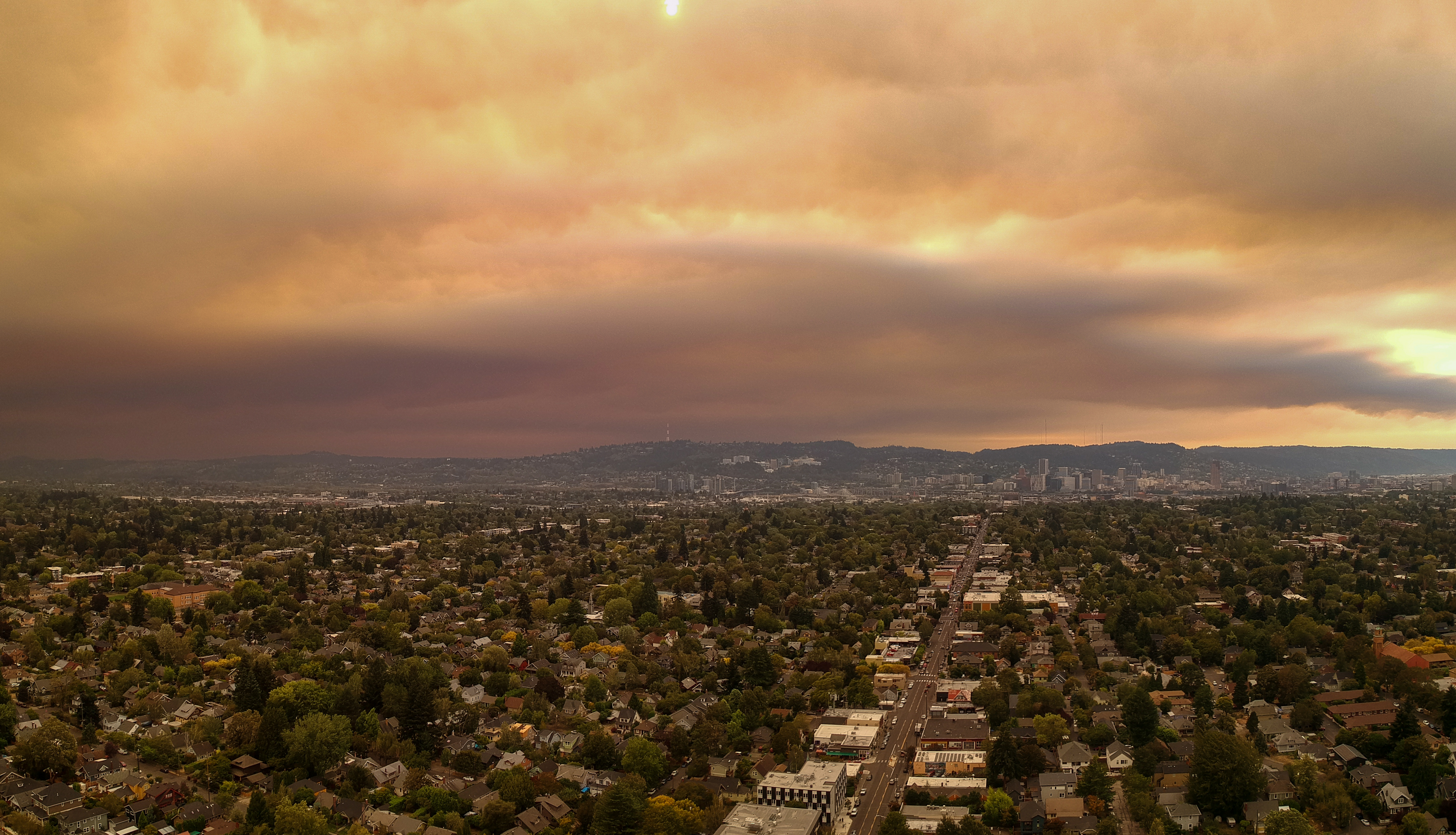
Smoke over Portland, Oregon on September 9

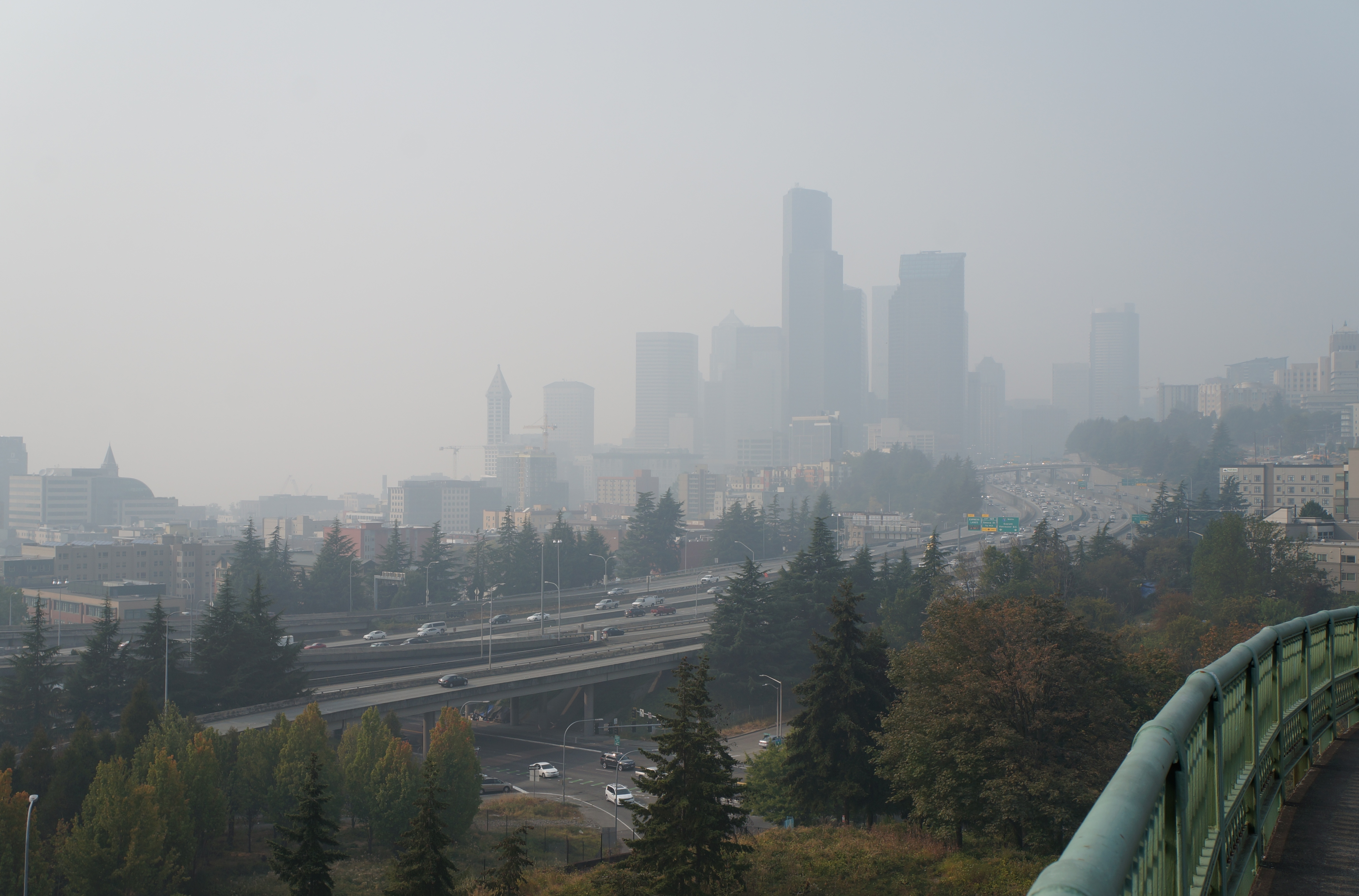
Air pollution obscuring the skyline of Seattle, Washington on September 11

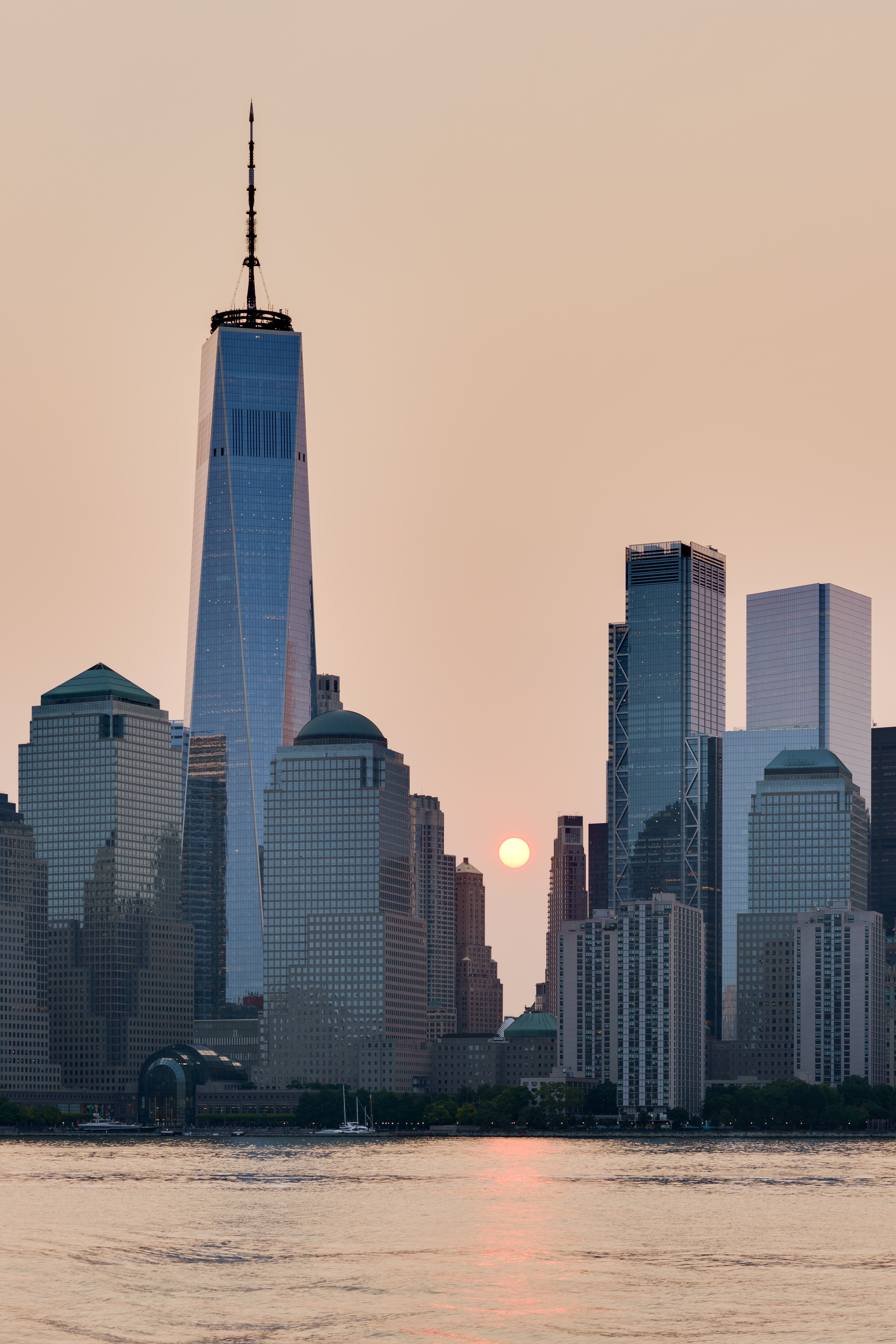
Haze in the upper atmosphere of New York City on September 16

=== Ecological effects ===
The unique sagebrush scrub habitat of the Columbia Basin in Washington was heavily affected by the fires, devastating populations of the endemic Columbia Basin pygmy rabbit and endangered, isolated populations of greater sage-grouse and Columbian sharp-tailed grouse. About half of the pygmy rabbit population and over 30-70% of the grouse population may have been lost to the fires, reversing decades of conservation work. Aside from climate change, the spread of the fires may have been assisted by the intrusion of invasive cheatgrass into the habitats. Fires in old-growth forests of Oregon may negatively affect the populations of the endangered northern spotted owl and pine marten, and the resulting ash from the fires may be washed into streams and threaten endangered salmon. Climate change also reduces the likelihood of forests re-establishing themselves after a fire.

The Cassia Crossbill may lose half its population due to the pending consequences of the wildfires, one of which engulfed a large portion of the South Hills, one of the only two strongholds for the bird.

== See also ==
- 2020s in environmental history

=== Other wildfires ===
- 2020 wildfire season
- 2020 Brazil rainforest wildfires
- 2019–20 Australian bushfire season
- 2019 Amazon rainforest wildfires
- 2019 Siberia wildfires
- List of California wildfires

=== General ===
- 2020 in the environment and environmental sciences
- Emergency evacuation procedures during the COVID-19 pandemic
