= Wildfires in 2020 =

Wildfire season in 2020

2020 wildfire season
- Date: January–December 2020

The 2020 wildfire season involved wildfires on multiple continents.

Below is a partial list of articles on wildfires from around the world in the year 2020.

== Asia ==
- 2020 Uttarakhand forest fires, India
- 2020 Russian wildfires
- 2020 Turkish wildfires

== Europe ==
- 2020 Chernobyl Exclusion Zone wildfires, Ukraine.

== North America ==
- 2020 Western United States wildfire season
  - 2020 Arizona wildfires
  - 2020 California wildfires
  - 2020 Nevada wildfires
  - 2020 New Mexico wildfires
  - 2020 Utah wildfires
  - 2020 Washington wildfires
  - 2020 Oregon wildfires
  - 2020 Colorado wildfires

== Oceania ==
- 2019–20 Australian bushfire season
- 2020–21 Australian bushfire season

== South America ==
- 2020 Córdoba wildfires, Argentina
- 2020 Delta del Paraná wildfires, Argentina
- 2020 Amazon and Pantanal wildfires, Brazil
