= 2020 Washington Labor Day fires =

2020 wildfires in Washington, United States

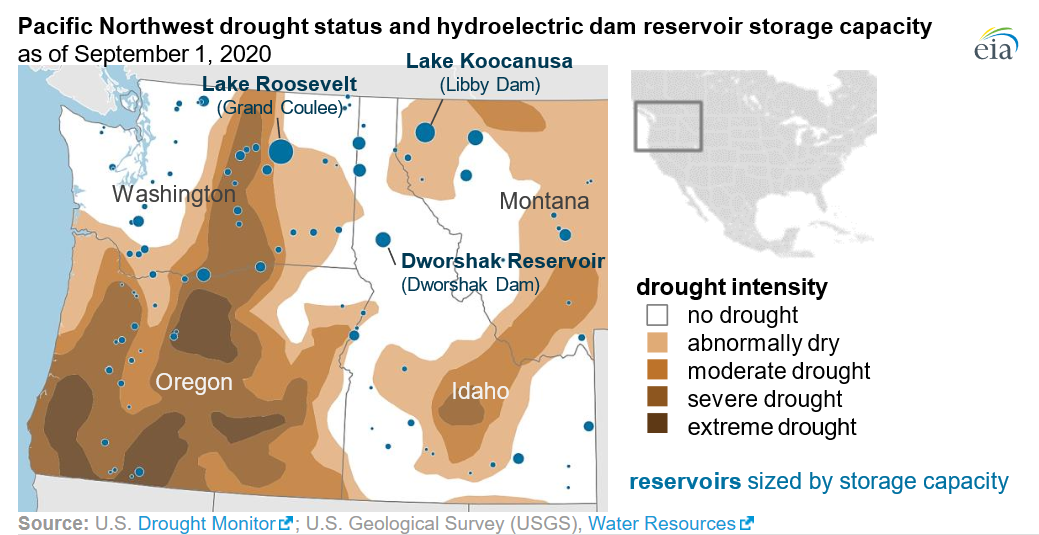
Drought intensity in the Pacific Northwest as of September 1, 2020

The 2020 Washington Labor Day fires were part of the 2020 wildfires in the U.S. state of Washington. The Labor Day fires began on September 7, 2020, driven by high winds. Some of the fires were sparked by downed power lines. More than 330,000 acres (130,000 ha) burned across the state of Washington, a one-day total greater than any of the last 12 entire fire seasons, according to the governor's office, and larger than the state's largest single fire, the Carlton Complex Fire of 2014.

== Beginning and growth ==
On September 7, a "historic fire event" with high winds resulted in 80 fires and nearly 300,000 acres (120,000 ha) burned. Malden and Pine City, in the Palouse Country of Eastern Washington, were mostly destroyed by one of the fires. The largest fire, Cold Springs Canyon Fire in Okanogan and Douglas Counties, was 10,000 acres on the evening of September 7 and had burned 175,000 acres by the morning of September 8. Owing to the Cold Springs Canyon Fire, the town of Mansfield was under "evacuate now" orders but all roads were closed. Smoke blanketed the Seattle area on September 8 and caused unhealthy air conditions throughout the Puget Sound region, mostly from air spilling over the Cascade Range from Eastern Washington. The smoke was noticeable in many parts of southern British Columbia, leading to air quality advisories in areas including Vancouver and Victoria. Pearl Hill Fire began when the fire jumped over 900 feet (270 m) to cross the Columbia River into Bridgeport. By the evening of September 8, the Cold Springs Canyon and adjacent Pearl Hill Fires had burned over 337,000 acres (136,000 ha) and neither was more than 10% contained. The Whitney Fire near Davenport was 100,000 acres (40,000 ha) large by September 9, when it was 5% contained. Pearl Hill Fire was 223,730 acres and over 90% contained by September 22; together Pearl Hill and Cold Springs Fires burned over 410,000 acres (170,000 ha).

Smaller fires in occurred in more populated areas of Western Washington. By September 9, the Sumner Grade Fire near Sumner closed Washington State Route 410, grew to 800 acres. Parts of Sumner and Bonney Lake were evacuated.

== Injuries, deaths, and losses ==
78 homes and 60 other structures were destroyed by the Cold Springs Fire, most of which were on the Colville Reservation.

Infrastructure destroyed by the fires included the historic Manning-Rye Covered Bridge in the Palouse, a wooden railroad trestle over the Yakima River near Prosser, and two other railroad bridges in the Tri-Cities area.

A one-year-old child was killed and the father and pregnant mother found on the banks of the Columbia River in Okanogan County badly burned, after attempting to outrun the Cold Springs Canyon Fire. The fire was considered by sheriff's detectives a potential homicide, if human-caused.

The smoke from the wildfire complex forced a Seattle Mariners game to be postponed.
