= Labor Day fire =

Labor Day fire may refer to one of the following:

- 2005 Labor Day brush fire, in California, which burned approximately 200 acres
- 2020 Washington Labor Day fires, in Washington state, which burned over 330,000 acres
