= 2020 Utah wildfires =

Wildfire season

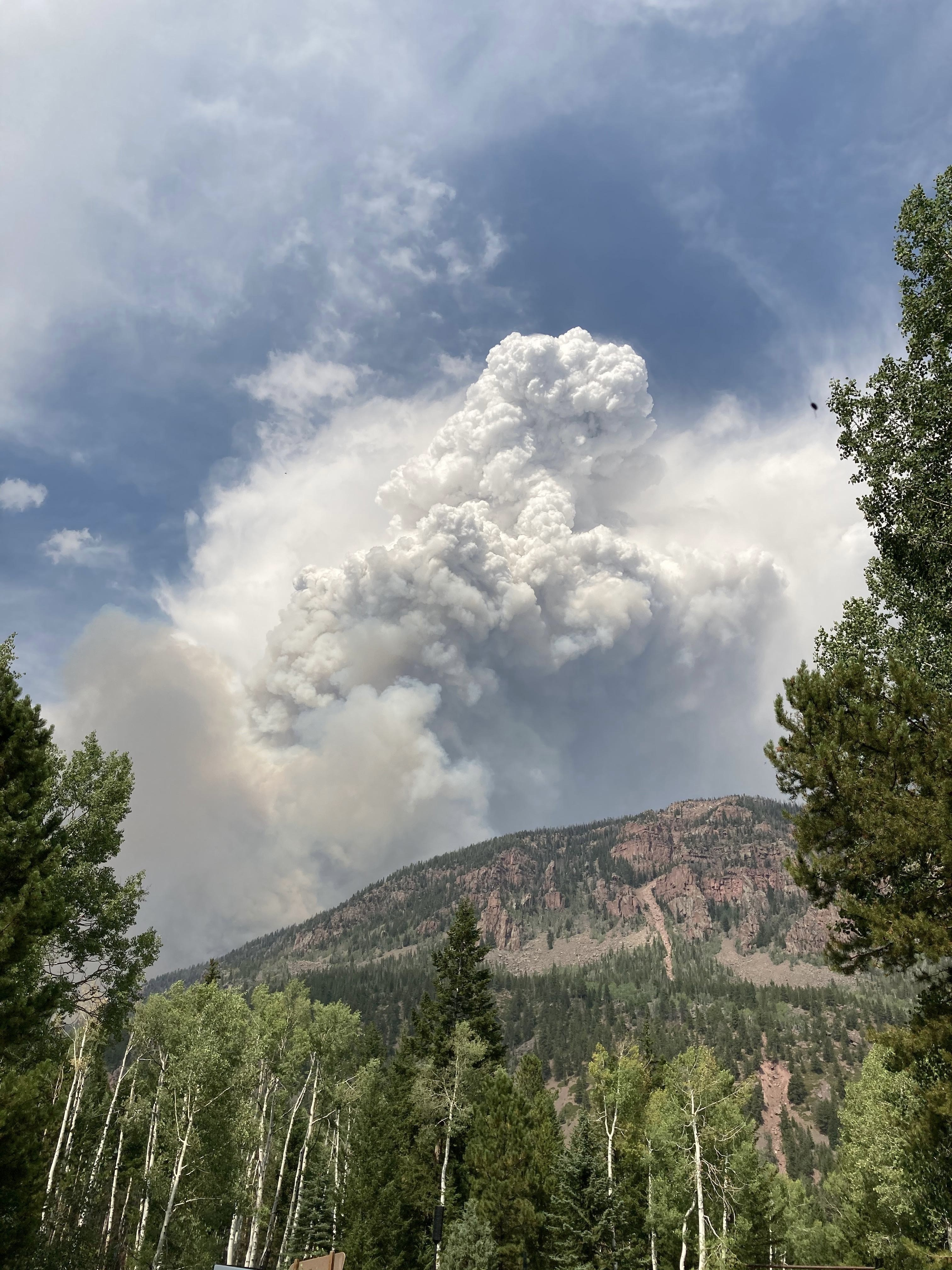
- Date: May 12 - November 7

Statistics
- Total fires: 1,547
- Total area: 329,732 acres

Impacts
- Cost: >$103 million (suppression)

The 2020 Utah wildfire season was a series of prominent wildfires throughout the state of Utah, lasting from June 1 through October 30, as defined by state law. Part of the 2020 Western United States wildfire season, Utah saw record-breaking numbers of human-caused fires. The largest fire of the season, the East Fork Fire, burned an area of 89,568 acres. In total, the suppression costs for the fires amounted to at least $103 million (2020 USD).

Of the 1,547 fires in Utah during 2020, 1,202 (78%) were human-caused, surpassing 2015's record of 937. These fires accounted for nearly 100,000 of the 329,732 total acres burned during this season. The significant rise in human-caused fires was attributed to the COVID-19 pandemic, as it forced recreation outside at higher rates.

== Background ==
While the typical "fire season" in Utah varies every year based on weather conditions, most wildfires occur in between July and October. Fire conditions heavily depend on monsoons; dry and late monsoons can exacerbate fire weather and promote drought at certain times of the year. Overall, fires are also affected by hot temperatures and dry conditions.

On May 27, Utah observed 237 wildfires (of which 95% were human-caused); a near fourfold increase compared to the previous season's 67 wildfires recorded at that same date. Throughout the early season, record-breaking numbers of fires (especially human-caused) exceeded previous season equivalents. This, coupled with an abnormally hot and dry spring led fire officials, meteorologists, and hydrologists to believe that the season would be unusually active.

== List of wildfires ==
The following is a list of fires that burned more than 1,000 acres (400 ha), or produced significant structural damage or casualties.

| Name | County | Acres | Start date | Containment date | Notes | Ref |
|---|---|---|---|---|---|---|
| Saddle | Wasatch | 683 | May 12 | May 22 | A juvenile was taken into custody on alleged connection to the Saddle Fire, and 3 other fires in the local area. | |
| Anderson Junction | Washington | 786 | May 18 | May 19 | Caused by vehicle dragging chains, 3 structures destroyed. | |
| Tabby Canyon | Tooele | 13,378.1 | May 30 | June 2 | Caused by exploding target. Merged with North Stansbury Fire on June 1 at 6,848.8 acres. | |
| North Stansbury (Tabby Canyon) | Tooele | 5,336.9 | June 1 | June 2 | Caused by heavy equipment use. Merged with Tabby Canyon Fire, lost its name. | |
| Bar H | Box Elder | 1,352 | June 3 | June 4 | Caused by lightning. | |
| Matlin | Box Elder | 6,292 | June 3 | June 4 | Caused by lightning. | |
| Elberta | Utah | 1,977 | June 5 | June 8 | Human-caused. | |
| Promontory | Weber | 1,000 | June 6 | June 8 | Caused by lightning. | |
| Lucin | Box Elder | 780 | June 12 | June 12 | Human-caused, partially burned a historic trestle from the Transcontinental Railroad Grade. | |
| Big Springs | Tooele | 2,912 | June 14 | June 16 | Human-caused, 11 structures destroyed. | |
| Rock Path | Millard, Beaver | 20,941 | June 25 | July 1 | Caused by lightning. Merged with Antelope Fire on June 27 at 6,000+ acres. | |
| Antelope (Rock Path) | Millard, Beaver | 3,000+ | June 25 | July 1 | Caused by lightning. Merged with Rock Path Fire, lost its name. | |
| Canal | Millard, Juab | 78,065 | June 27 | July 13 | Caused by lightning. 100% contained on June 27 at 450 acres, escaped containment on June 28 due to strong winds. Destroyed 34 structures. | |
| Wire Pass | Kane | 1,588 | June 26 | July 2 | Caused by lightning. Started north of the Utah-Arizona border above the Mangum Fire within relatively close proximity. | |
| Knolls | Utah | 12,979 | June 28 | July 3 | Human-caused. 3,100+ homes evacuated in Saratoga Springs, an estimated 13,000+ people. 1 home destroyed, 12 damaged. | |
| Lund | Iron | 837 | July 4 | July 4 | Human-caused, 1 structure and 2 cars destroyed. | |
| Big Summit | Iron, Lincoln | 8,461 | July 13 | July 21 | Started near Panaca, Nevada, and crossed into Utah on July 14. Evacuations in Hamlin Valley, destroyed 1 structure. | |
| Veyo West | Washington | 2,618 | July 13 | July 23 | Human-caused, 7 structures destroyed. | |
| Turkey Farm Road | Washington | 11,993 | July 13 | July 19 | Caused by fireworks, 1 structure destroyed. | |
| Howell Peak | Millard | 1,885 | July 19 | August 6 | | |
| Cottonwood Trail | Washington | 1,631 | July 19 | July 21 | Caused by a blown tire. | |
| Dennis Hill | Box Elder | 2,658 | July 20 | July 26 | Human-caused. | |
| Pine Hollow | Kane, Coconino | 11,405 | July 29 | August 5 | Caused by lightning one mile south of the Utah-Arizona border, and crossed into Utah. It entered the perimeter of the Wire Pass fire that burned a month prior. | |
| Hollow | Sanpete, Utah | 1,416 | July 31 | August 3 | Human-caused, destroyed 2 structures. | |
| Richard Mountain | Daggett, Sweetwater | 7,633 | August 3 | August 11 | Started in Wyoming, and crossed into Utah on the same day. | |
| East Fork | Duchesne | 89,765 | August 21 | November 5 | Caused by lightning. Merged with the Phinney Lake fire at 10,040 acres. It destroyed 11 structures. | |
| Greenville | Beaver | 1,103 | August 22 | August 23 | Caused by lightning. | |
| Gray Hill | Millard | 6,845 | August 23 | August 24 | Caused by lightning. | |
| Center Creek Trail | Duchesne | 1,274 | August 25 | October 13 | Caused by lightning. | |
| Phinney Lake (East Fork) | Duchesne | 4,469 | August 30 | November 5 | Caused by lightning. Started north of the East Fork fire and merged with it on September 7, losing its name. | |
| William | Utah, Juab | 5,832 | September 6 | November 9 | Caused by target shooting. Started in Utah County, and spread south into Juab County. | |
| White Sage | Tooele | 6,000 | September 18 | September 21 | Human-caused, started in the Dugway Proving Ground. | |
| Veyo Road | Washington | 2,262 | September 27 | September 30 | Human-caused. | |
| Range | Utah | 3,496 | October 17 | November 11 | Caused by police target shooting. | |
| Fire Canyon | Summit | 1,670 | October 18 | October 21 | Human-caused. | |
| Hag Boundry | Box Elder | 2,727 | October 29 | October 29 | Started in the Utah Test and Training Range's northern segment near the Great Salt Lake. | |
| Snow Canyon | Washington | 1,000 | November 6 | November 7 | Human-caused. | |
As of September 19, 2026 (UTC) Live fire updates: https://utahfireinfo.gov/active-wildfires

== See also ==
- 2020 Western United States wildfire season
- COVID-19 pandemic in Utah
