= 2020 Washington wildfires =

Wildfire season in Washington, United States

- Date: March 2020–October 2020

Statistics
- Total area: 842,370 acres (340,900 ha)

Impacts
- Deaths: 1
- Structures destroyed: 377, including 181 homes

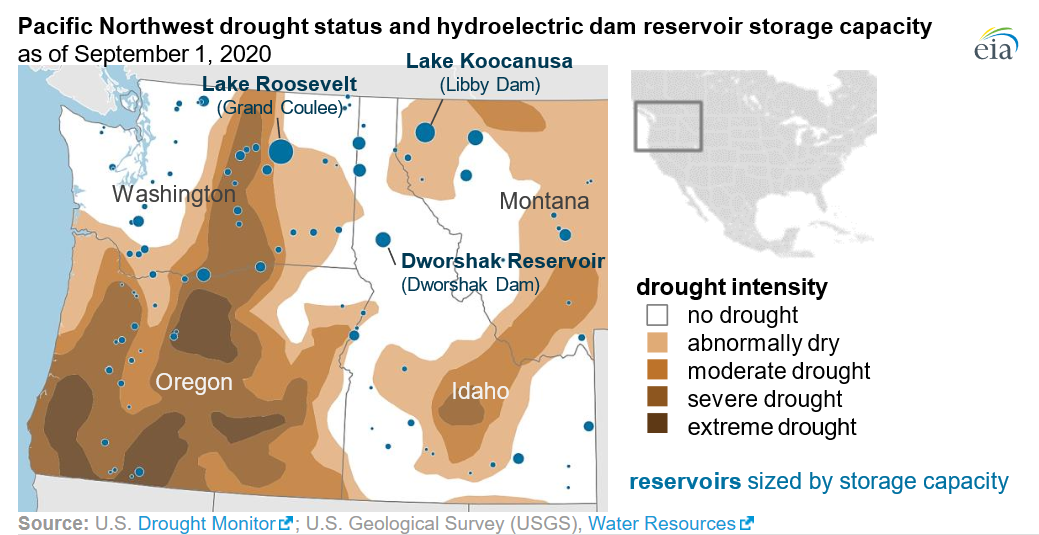
Drought intensity in the Pacific Northwest as of September 1, 2020

The 2020 Washington wildfire season officially began in March 2020. The season was a part of the 2020 Western United States wildfires. By September, wildfires had burned over 713,000 acres, 181 homes had been lost, and one death occurred as a result. The 2020 fire season saw more individual fires than in any other recorded year.

== Background ==
While the typical "fire season" in Washington varies every year based on weather conditions, most wildfires occur in between July and October. However, hotter, drier conditions can allow wildfires to start outside of these boundaries. Wildfires tend to start at these times of the year after moisture from winter and spring precipitation dries up. Vegetation and overall conditions are the hottest and driest in these periods. The increase of vegetation can make the fires spread easier.

== Predictions and preparation ==
Based on environmental factors and forest conditions, the Washington–Oregon wildfires were projected to be the worst in the United States during 2020.

Firefighting was expected to be complicated by personnel and resource shortages, and lack of training, due to the COVID-19 pandemic in Washington. By mid-May, one Washington State Department of Natural Resources firefighter had tested positive for the novel coronavirus and officials weren't sure how to get crews across quarantine boundaries and into Washington. Experts said another effect may be that plans to fight fires would be scaled back and many 2020 fires would be left to burn.

Department of Natural Resources training began June 19 outside Hamilton, Washington, in Skagit County. According to the Skagit Valley Herald, interagency training in Washington that usually involves federal, state and local firefighting agencies was canceled due to COVID-19 concerns.

== Fires ==
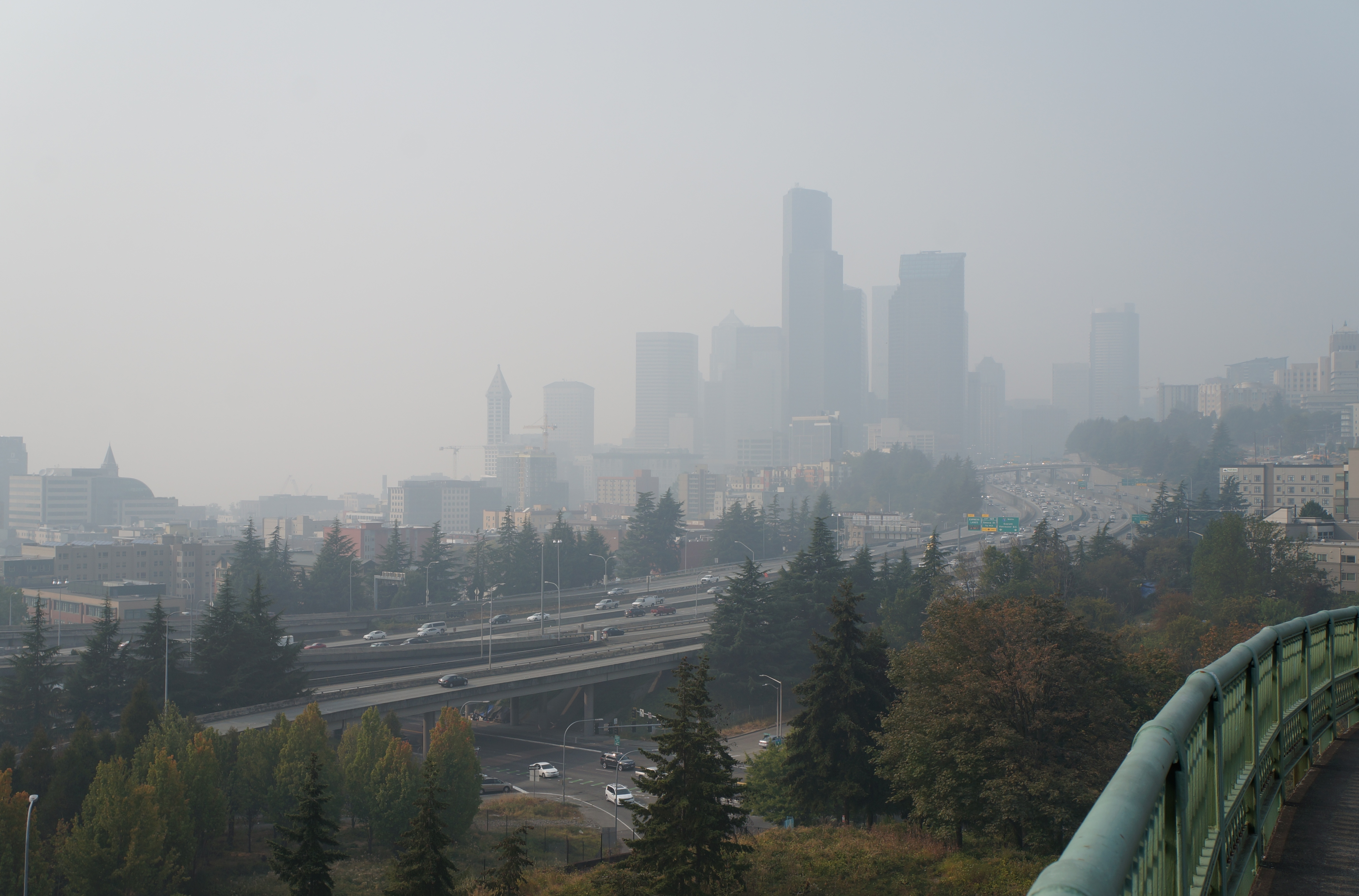
Smoky air in Downtown Seattle due to wildfires

On April 26 two fires were burning: the Stanwood Bryant Fire in Snohomish County (70 acres) and the Porter Creek Fire in Whatcom County (80 acres).

Between July 16 and 30, the Washington State Department of Natural Resources (DNR) and many county governments – including Mason, Thurston, King, Pierce and Whatcom Counties – issued fire safety burn bans due to elevated risk of uncontrolled fires.

In late July, a brush fire in Chelan County, the Colockum Fire, burned at least 3,337 acres (1,350 ha) and caused homes to be evacuated. A fire on the Colville Reservation near Nespelem called the Greenhouse Fire burned at least 5,146 acres (2,083 ha) and caused the evacuation of the Colville Tribal Corrections Facility and other structures.

On August 19, Governor Jay Inslee declared a state of emergency for all of Washington, with fires burning on the Olympic Peninsula and in Eastern Washington. Among the active fires was the 24,000-acre (9,700 ha) Taylor Pond Fire near Yakima. By August 20, the Palmer Fire near Oroville – which started August 18 – had reached 13,000 acres (5,300 ha) and forced evacuation of up to 85 homes. The largest of the fires in the Olympics reached 2.4 acres (0.97 ha) by August 20.

The Evans Canyon Fire, a few miles north of Naches, was ignited around August 31 and expanded to tens of thousands of acres, shut down Washington State Route 821 in the Yakima River Canyon, burned several homes and caused hundreds of families to evacuate, and caused unhealthy air quality in Yakima County. By September 6, it had burned almost 76,000 acres.

=== Labor Day ===
On September 7, a "historic fire event" with high winds resulted in 80 fires and nearly 300,000 acres burned in a day. Malden and Pine City, in the Palouse region of Eastern Washington, were mostly destroyed by one of the fires. By the evening of September 8, the Cold Springs Canyon and adjacent Pearl Hill Fires had burned over 337,000 acres (136,000 ha) and neither was more than 10% contained. Smoke blanketed the Seattle area on September 8 and caused unhealthy air conditions throughout the Puget Sound region, and affected Southwest British Columbia.

== Recovery ==
In early August, the Washington Military Department set up Starlink satellite ground stations for data connectivity in areas where terrestrial communications were lost due to the fires. The systems were engineered and manufactured by SpaceX in Redmond, Washington. It was "the first early application of the company's service to be disclosed".

== See also ==
- List of Washington wildfires
- Western U.S. wildfire trends
