= 2020 New Mexico wildfires =

Fire season

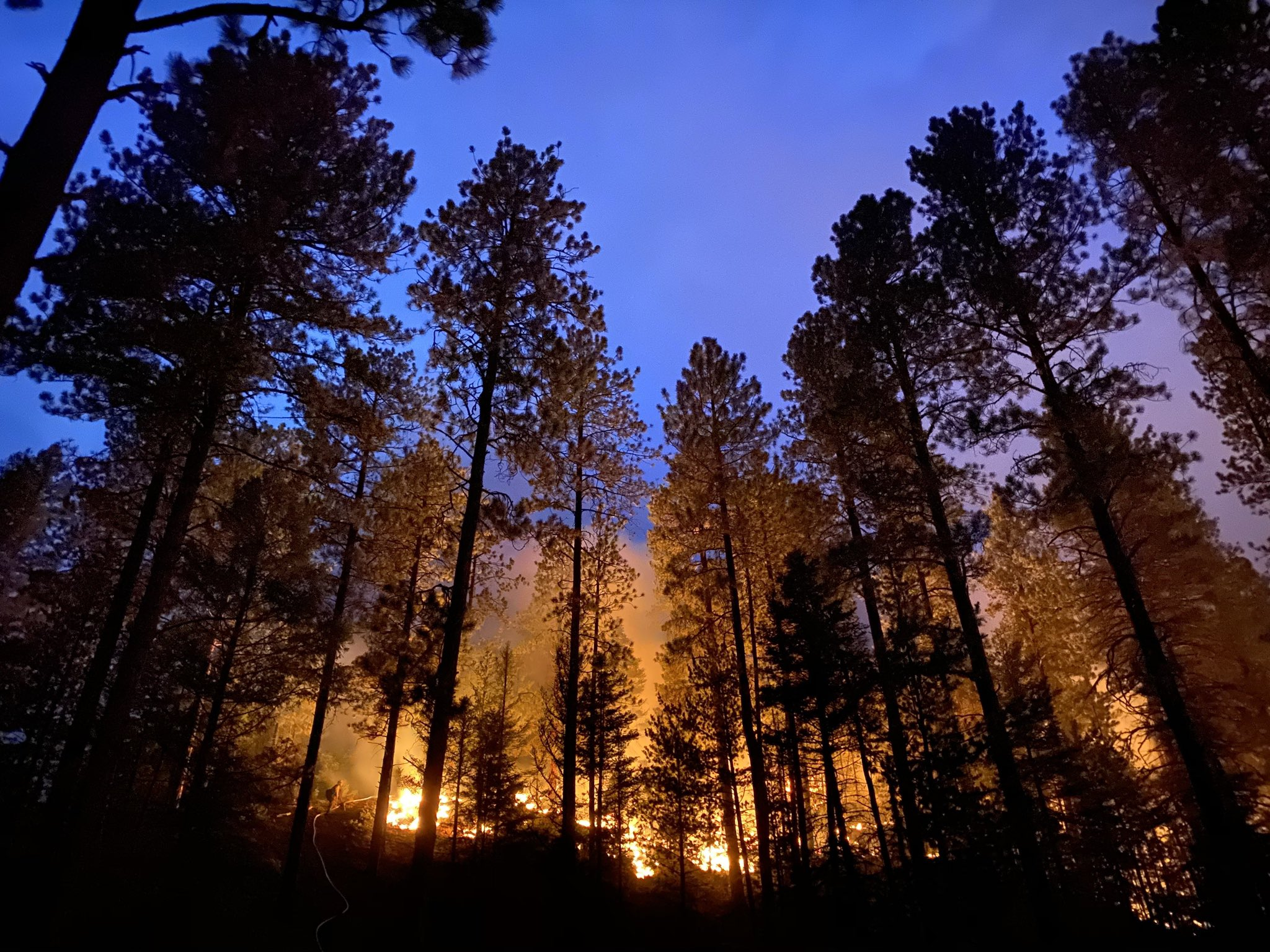
- Wildfire part of the 2020 New Mexico wildfire season
- Date: June 2020 – October 2020

Statistics
- Total fires: >500

The 2020 New Mexico wildfire season began in May 2020. At least 543 wildfires burned across the state, with fires burning as late as October 2020. The season was a part of the 2020 Western United States wildfire season.

== Background ==
While "fire season" can vary every year in New Mexico based on weather conditions, most wildfires occur in from early May through June, before the monsoon season. However, there is an increasing fire risk year-round from climate change. Droughts are becoming more common partly from rising temperatures in the state that evaporate water from streams. Unpredictable monsoon levels can increase fire risks. New Mexico is prone to strong winds, and jet stream disruption from climate change can make them stronger. Intense winds contribute to drought, allow wildfires to spread, and dry out vegetation. Unique plant life and fine fuels in the state fuel wildfires, especially in the Eastern New Mexico grasslands. Rising temperatures will reduce snowpack and shorten the snowmelt season which can increase drought and wildfire severity.

Overgrazing and logging in the late 1800s and over 100 years of strict fire suppression affected natural systems of New Mexico led to a growing wildfire risk and intensity. Scientists predict New Mexico's forests will gradually deteriorate, turning into shrublands as wildfires burn the forests.

== List of wildfires ==
The following is a list of fires that burned more than 1,000 acres (400 ha), or produced significant structural damage or casualties.

Name	County	Acres	Start date	Containment date	Notes	Ref
West 380	Lea	1,689	January 9	January 9	Human-caused	
Pedro	Guadalupe	1,017	April 6	April 6	Human-caused	
Moore	Mora	3,800	May 2	May 2	Human-caused	
Sloan Canyon	Union	1,173	May 23	May 29	Lightning-caused	
K107	Harding	1,355	June 6	June 6	Lightning-caused	
Turkey	Grant	1,800	June 6	June 11	Lightning-caused	
Farm Camp	San Miguel	22,872	June 6	June 14	Lightning-caused	
Uvas	Doña Ana	1,135	June 6	June 14	Lightning-caused	
Good	Grant	17,950	June 6	July 15	Lightning-caused	
Tadpole	Grant	11,159	June 6	July 17	Lightning-caused	
Vics Peak	Socorro	14,624	June 15	August 4	Threatened Mexican spotted owl habitat. Lightning-caused	
Cub	Catron	25,950	June 28	July 30	Lightning-caused	
Naranjos	Mora	2,580	July 15	July 15	Cause unknown	
Luna	Taos, Mora	10,142	October 17	November 10	Campfire	
