= Canal Fire =

2020 wildfire in Utah, United States

- Part of the 2020 Utah wildfires
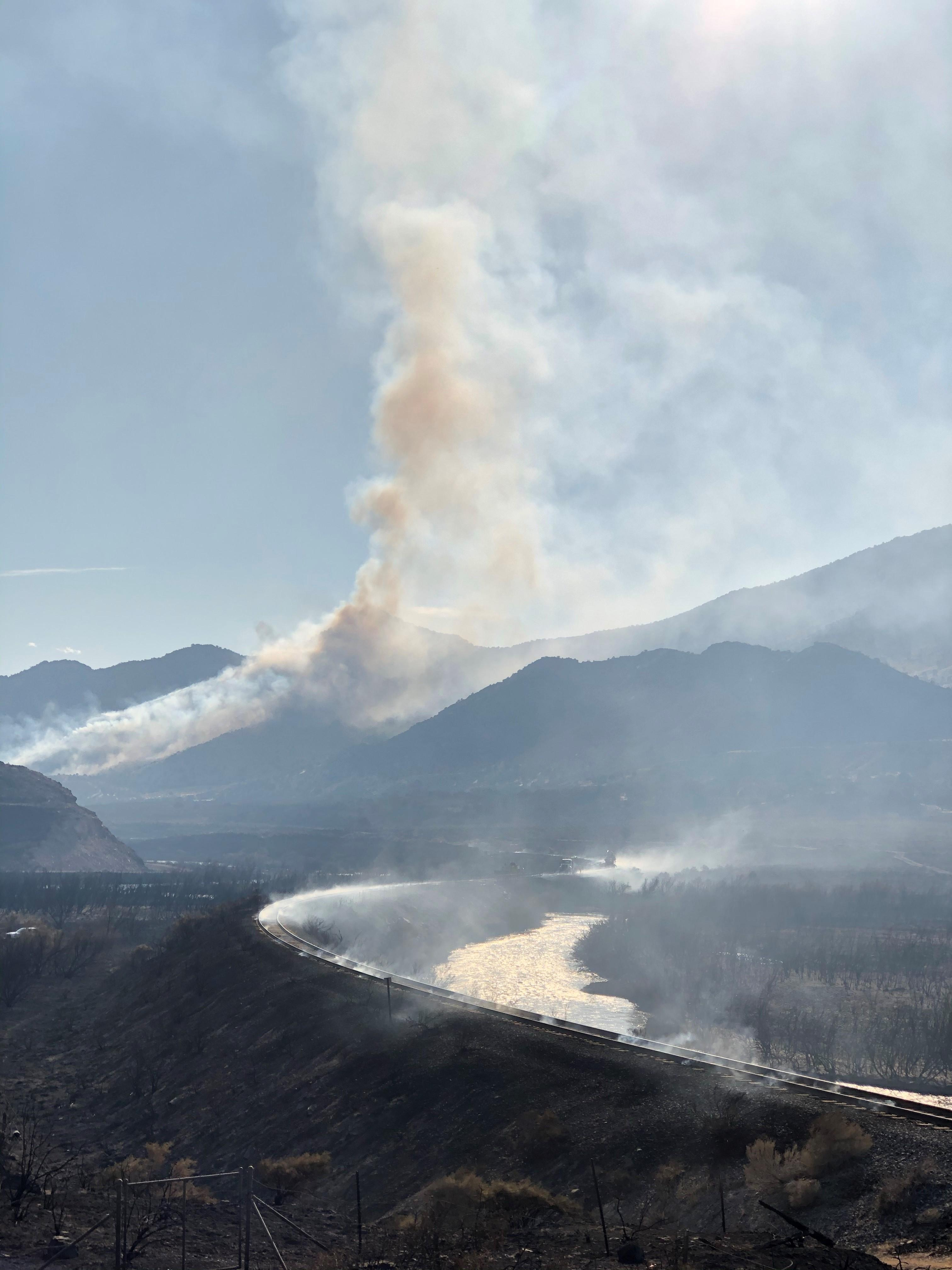
- Canal Fire on July 1, 2020 from Leamington, Utah
- Date: June 26, 2020–July 11, 2020
- Location: Millard County, Utah, United States
- Coordinates: 39.425°N 112.347°W

Statistics
- Burned area: 78,065 acres (31,592 ha)

Ignition
- Cause: Lightning strike

Map
- Location in Utah

The Canal Fire was a wildfire that burned Millard County in Utah in the United States. First reported on June 26, 2020, the fire burned 78,065 acres (31,592 ha) on public land, including Fishlake National Forest and land owned by the Bureau of Land Management. Started by a lightning strike, the fire was contained on June 27, only to escape containment on June 28 due to strong winds. The fire led to the mandatory evacuation of Fool Creek Peak and Leamington, Utah. It was contained on July 11, 2020.

== Events ==
=== June ===
The Canal Fire was reported burning five miles north of Oak City, Utah in Fishlake National Forest on June 26, 2020, around 4 PM. Started by a lightning strike, the fire is fueled by dry conditions, high winds, pinyon-juniper, tall grass, and brush. The fire threatened structures and power lines in the area. The start of the Canal Fire made it the second fire to burn in Millard County, Utah, alongside the Antelope Fire.

By the next day, June 27, the fire was 100 percent contained at 450 acres (182 ha). However, the next day, June 28, the fire escaped containment lines. The area of Fool Creek Peak and the community of Leamington, Utah were evacuated. By June 29, the fire had exploded to 60,000 acres (24,281 ha) and was ten percent contained. An unknown number of structures and outbuildings were destroyed by the fire. Crews began creating fire lines around homes. Evacuation orders were lifted.

=== July ===
As of the evening of July 1, the fire has burned 69,176 acres (27,995 ha). Earlier that day, crews built containment lines on the southwest side (west of Highway 125 and east of Lynndyl), the northwest flank (north of Leamington and the Sevier River), and the east flank (along the Sevier River). Crews continue to build containment lines on all sides, with crews finally moving into Fool Creek Canyon to begin containment in the rural, south part of the fire. The east flank remains the most active part of the fire. Oak Creek Canyon Road, the campground, Fool Creek Canyon Road and Leamington Pass were closed.

By the evening of July 3, 2020, the fire had grown to 76,647 acres (31,018 ha) and was 45 percent contained. That day, crews successfully contained the southwestern flank of the fire.

The Canal Fire was contained at 78,065 acres (31,592 ha) on July 11, 2020.

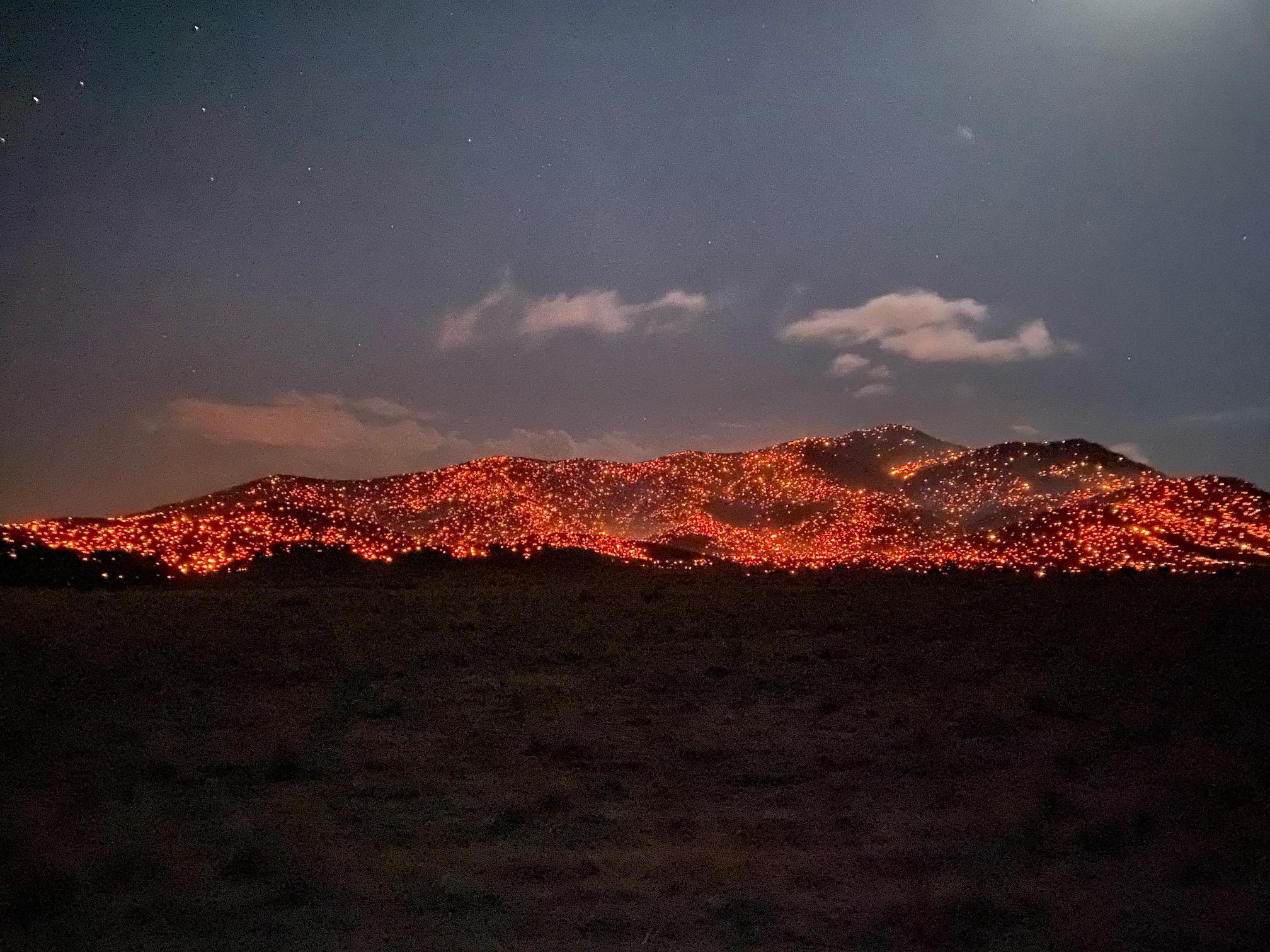
The Canal Fire burning at night on June 28, 2020.

== Impact ==
The fire threatened structures and power lines in Fishlake National Forest and on Bureau of Land Management and state land. It also threatened homes and structures near Fool Creek Peak and Leamington. On June 28, both Fool Creek and Leamington were evacuated. Residents were allowed to return the following day. An unknown number of outbuildings and structures were destroyed.

The Canal Fire led to the closure of a wide swath of land in the Fillmore National Forest Fillmore Ranger District, including Leamington Pass, Oak Creek Canyon, Fool Creek Canyon, and numerous trails, forest roads and Oak Creek Canyon campground.

== See also ==
- 2020 Utah wildfires
