= Vics Peak Fire =

Wildfire in New Mexico, United States

- Part of the 2020 New Mexico wildfires
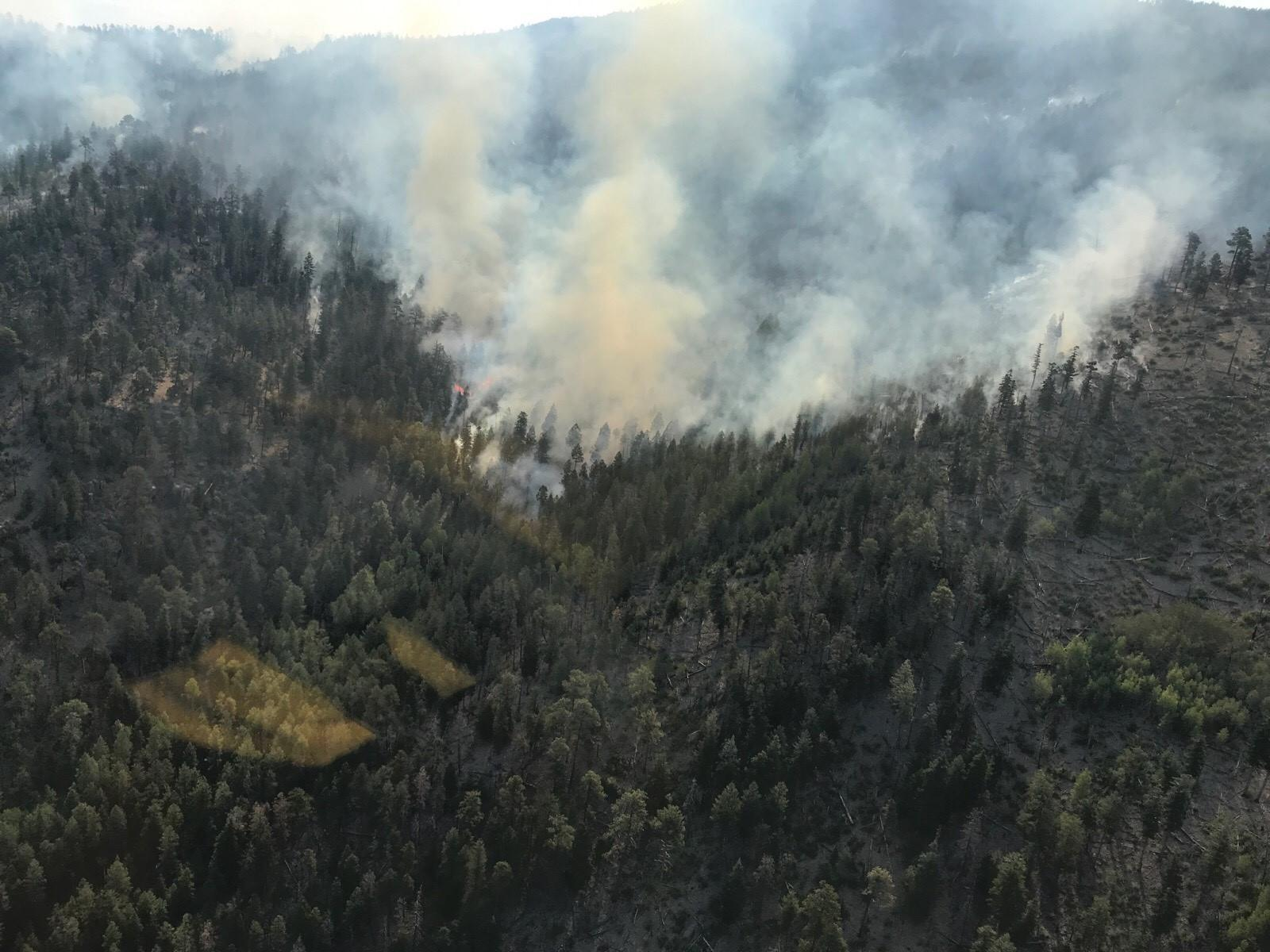
- Vics Peak Fire on July 12, 2020
- Date: June 15, 2020–August 4, 2020
- Location: Apache Kid Wilderness, Cibola National Forest, New Mexico, United States
- Coordinates: 33.57°N 107.442°W

Statistics
- Burned area: 14,624 acres (5,918 ha)

Ignition
- Cause: Lightning strike

Map
- Location in New Mexico

Vics Peak Fire was wildfire that burned in the Apache Kid Wilderness in the Cibola National Forest in New Mexico, United States. First reported on June 15, 2020, the fire was started by a lightning strike. The fire burned 14,624 acres (5,918 ha). It was contained on August 4, 2020. The fire threatened private property, utilities infrastructure, and natural resources in the area, including the habitat of the Mexican spotted owl. It also impacted recreational activities in the area due to trail and campground closures.

== Events ==
=== June ===
The Vics Peak Fire was first reported burning in a remote area of the Apache Kid Wilderness in Cibola National Forest on June 15, 2020. Started by a lightning strike, the fire grew moderately and was monitored by fire crews. However, on June 18, unexpected fire behavior caused the fire to grow in size and two days later it had burned 2,827 acres (1,144 ha). Fueled by mixed conifer, ponderosa pine, pinyon-juniper and mahogany, smoke was visible from Interstate 40, Highway 1, and Highway 107. A temporary flight restriction was put in place over the fire. Forest Road 225 and trails leading into Apache Kid Wilderness were closed.

By the morning of June 23, the fire had grown to 7,023 acres (2,842 ha). However, the next day, accurate mapping led to the acreage to be re-evaluated at 6,729 acres (2,723 ha). The fire also had its first day of partial containment at 5 percent. In addition to the trails, two campgrounds were closed. Medical screening and decontamination team were placed near all crew camps to support firefighters general health and to monitor for COVID-19. The temporary flight restriction was expanded from five miles to 10 miles on June 26. The next day, crews began work to protect nesting sites for the Mexican spotting owls, which are on the endangered species list. The fires containment declined to three percent as the fire grew to 9,293 acres (3,761 ha). As of June 30, the fire had burned 9,924 acres (4,016 ha) and is three percent contained.

=== July ===
The fire had burned 10,624 acres (4,299 ha) by July 1, 2020 and was 18 percent contained. The next day, fire officials stated that the threat of the fire growing had "slowed dramatically" and clean up continued. By July 11, it had been 50 percent contained. The fire moved between Milo Canyon and Smith Canyon, backing slowly into San Mateo Canyon. Additionally, fire progressed north from West Blue and Teepee Peak Mountains, in the 1994 Coffee Pot Fire footprint. A monsoon entered the area, bringing moisture and concerns about flash floods. On July 16, crews started the Burn Area Emergency Response post-fire assessment.

== Impact ==
The fire impacted recreational activities in the Apache Kid Wilderness. Upon the fire's growth, on June 19 trails into the wilderness and two campgrounds were closed. It also threatened the San Mateo Lookout and Pankey Mine. Even after containment, numerous trails and one campground remain closed.

While fighting the fire, crews had to improve existing Forest Roads in the fire region, which resulted in better driving conditions in the long-term.

=== Environmental ===
The fire threatened habitat for the Mexican spotted owl. To support the owls, crews protected nesting sites using structure support and defensible space.

According to the Burn Area Emergency Response (BAER) post-fire assessment, approximately 65 percent of the acreage in the fire's footprint was unburned or had low burn severity; 27 percent sustained moderate burn severity; and 2 percent suffered high burn severity. Six percent was not classified. Flash floods remain a concern.

== See also ==
- 2020 New Mexico wildfires
