= 2020 Brazil rainforest wildfires =

Wildfires in Brazil

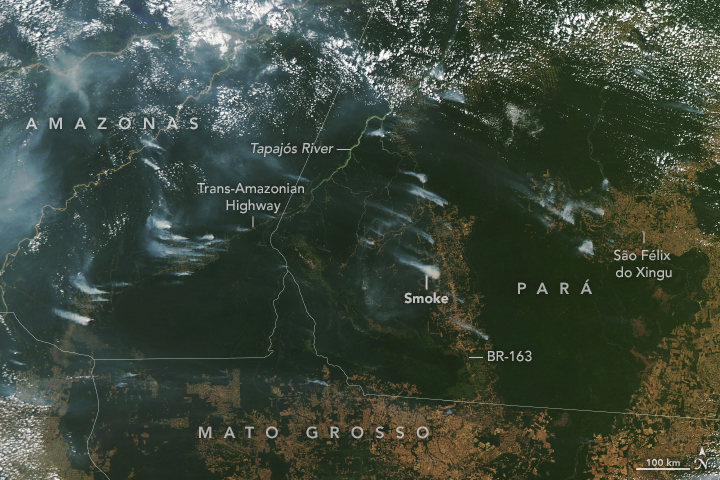
- Image of August 1, 2020, from the MODIS satellite.
- Date: January 2020 - August 2020
- Location: Amazonas and Pantanal

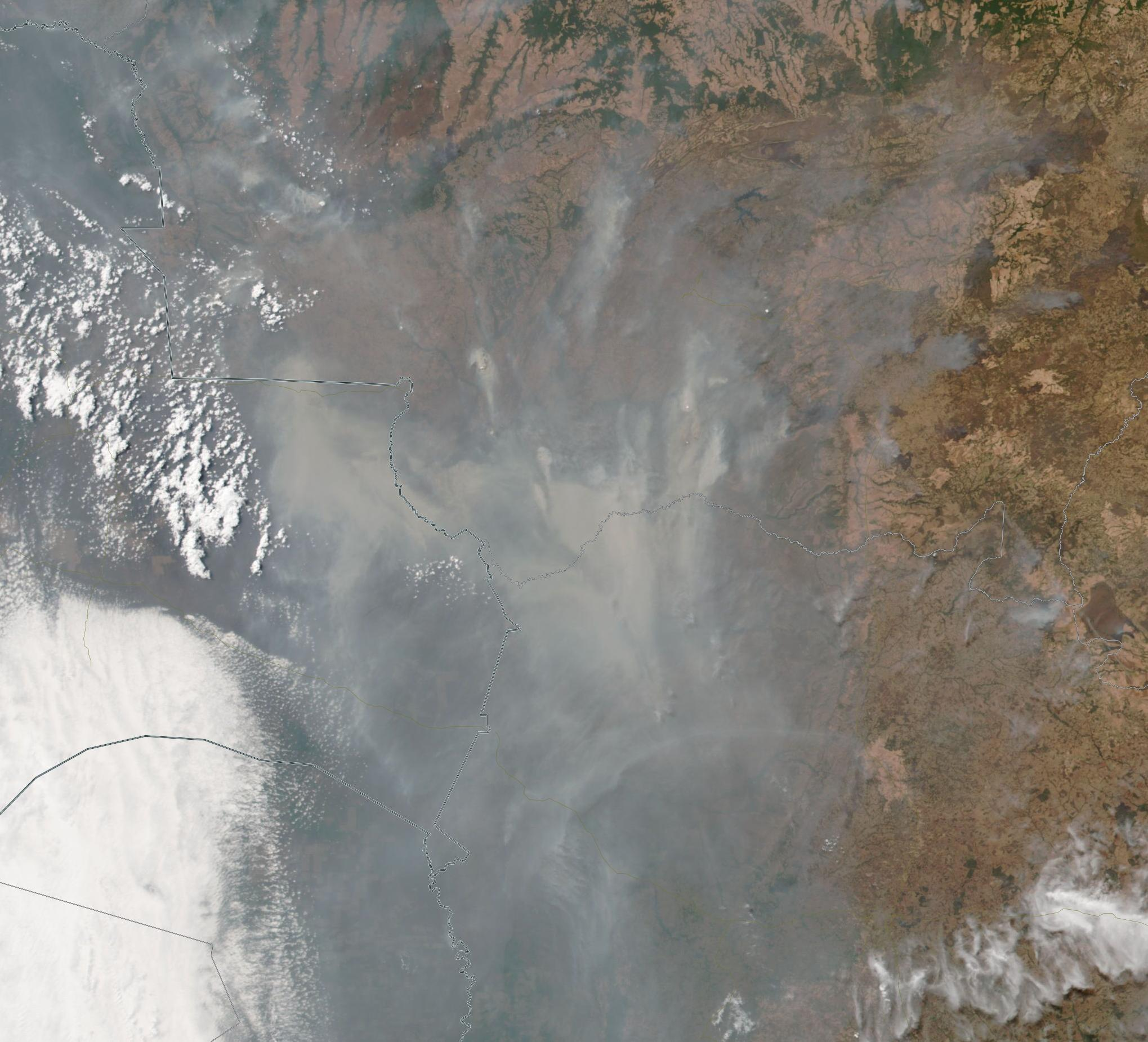
Satellite image showing the smoke from the Pantanal fires on September 14, 2020.

The 2020 Brazil rainforest wildfires were a series of forest fires that were affecting Brazil, with 44,013 outbreaks of fires registered between January and August in the Amazonas and Pantanal. Within the Amazon, 6,315 outbreaks of fire were detected in the same period. Within the Pantanal, the volume of fires is equivalent to those of the past six years and there have been actions by NGOs and volunteers to save endangered animals, such as the jaguar. It was expected that the health systems of the Amazon region, already overloaded by the COVID-19 pandemic, would be even more overloaded due to respiratory diseases due to smoke emitted by the wildfires.

Expertise carried out points out that the fires in the Pantanal were started by human action and the Environmental Police Station investigates who are possibly responsible.

Douglas Morton, head of NASA's Biospheric Sciences Laboratory, considers fires to be "unprecedented". Although the Brazilian government has instituted a 120-day ban on burning in the Amazon, an analysis led by NASA indicates that this was of little effect.

Between May 28 and August 25, 516 fire points were detected covering an area of 376,416 hectares.

In August, President Jair Bolsonaro's response was that "the media and foreign governments are presenting a false narrative about the Amazon". The same month Brazil's National Institute for Space Research reported that satellite data shows that the number of fires in the Amazon increased by 28% to ~6,800 fires in July compared to the ~5,300 wildfires in July 2019. This indicated a, potentially worsened, repeat of 2019's accelerated destruction of one of the world's largest protectable buffers against global warming in 2020. Satellites in September recorded 32,017 hotspots in the world's largest rainforest, a 61% rise from the same month in 2019.

In September INPE reported that 1,359 km^{2} of the Brazilian Amazon have burned off in August, which may put the effectiveness of the contemporary response against the deforestation – such as considerations of economic interventions and the current military operation – into question. The 6,087 km^{2} of lost rainforest in 2020 as of early September – ~95% of the period in 2019 – is about the size of Palestine.

In the Pantanal, part of the fire started in private areas or legal reserves (which is protected by law) and spread to indigenous territories. On 13 September preliminary data based on satellite images, indicate that 1.5 million hectares have burned in the Pantanal region since the start of August, surpassing the previous fire season record from 2005. On September 15 it was reported that 23,500 km^{2} – ~12% of the Pantanal – have burned off in 2020, killing millions of vertebrates.

== See also ==
- 2024 Brazil wildfires
- 2020 wildfire season
- 2019 Amazon rainforest wildfires
- 1967 Rio Doce State Park wildfire
- Deforestation of the Amazon rainforest
