= Manning-Rye Covered Bridge =

- U.S. National Register of Historic Places
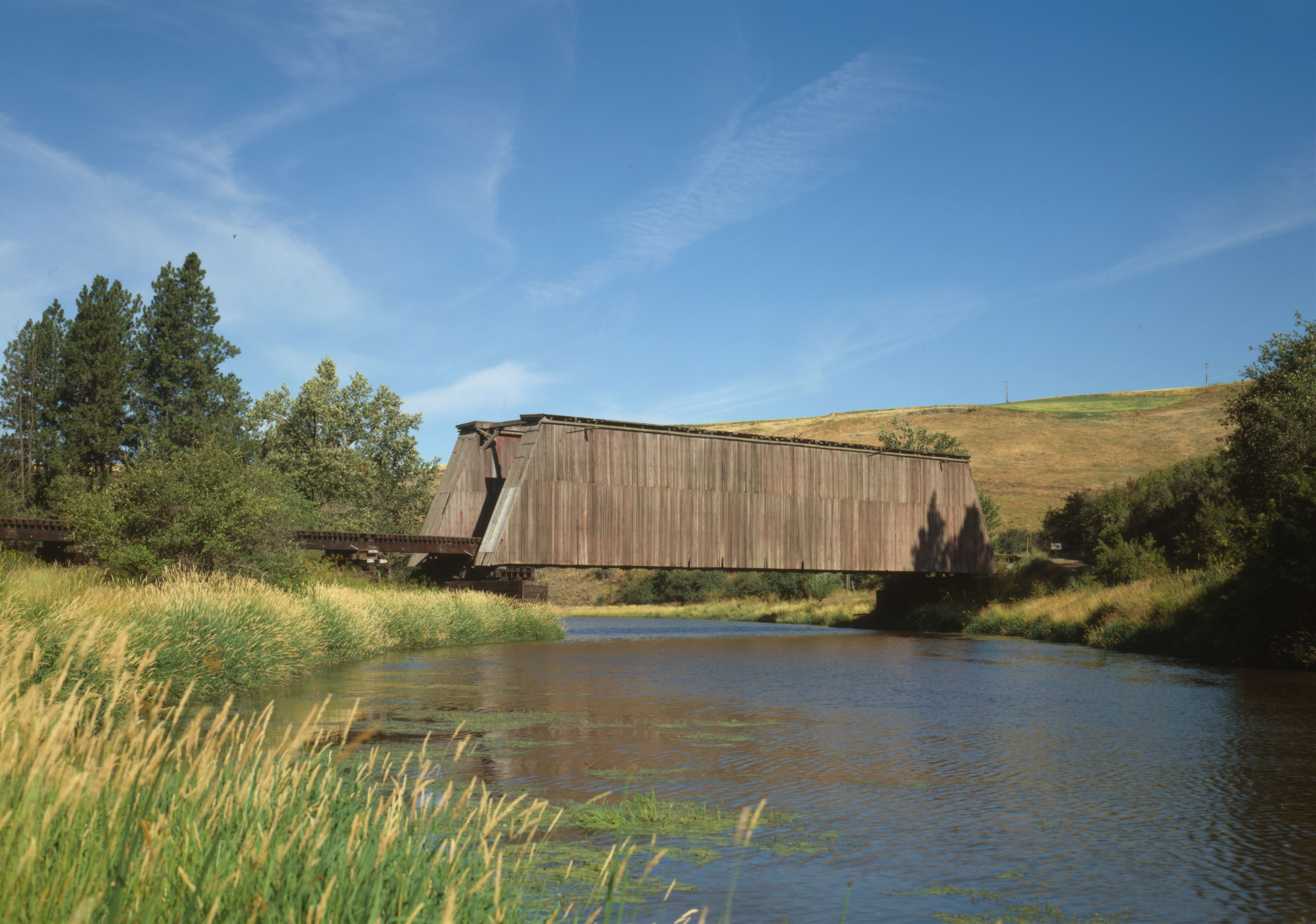

- Location within Washington (state)
- Location: Spans Palouse River, Colfax, Washington
- Coordinates: 46.928388°N 117.415340°W
- Area: less than one acre
- Built: c. 1918
- Built by: Spokane and Inland Empire Railroad
- MPS: Historic Bridges/Tunnels in Washington State TR
- NRHP reference No.: 82004307
- Added to NRHP: July 16, 1982

The Manning-Rye Covered Bridge, spanning the Palouse River near Colfax, Washington, was built around 1918. It was listed on the National Register of Historic Places in 1982. It has also been known as the Harpole Bridge.

It was a work of the Spokane and Inland Empire Railroad, an interurban electric railroad.

Its "timber housing protects a single span timber Howe truss which rests on timber pile abutments, encased with timber cribs." Although it is deemed a covered bridge, the top of the bridge was left uncovered to allow for connection between the locomotive and the overhead electric lines.

The bridge came into ownership of the Great Northern Railroad, and was used as a railroad bridge until 1967. It was purchased in 1969 by a private owner who replaced rails by wooden planking and used it for automobile access to their property.

It was located one mile from County Route 4, in the vicinity of Colfax, in Whitman County, Washington.

The bridge was destroyed on September 7, 2020, by the Manning Fire, a wildfire that was started by a downed electric transmission line.
