= Evans Canyon Fire =

2020 wildfire in Washington, United States

- Part of the 2018 Washington wildfires
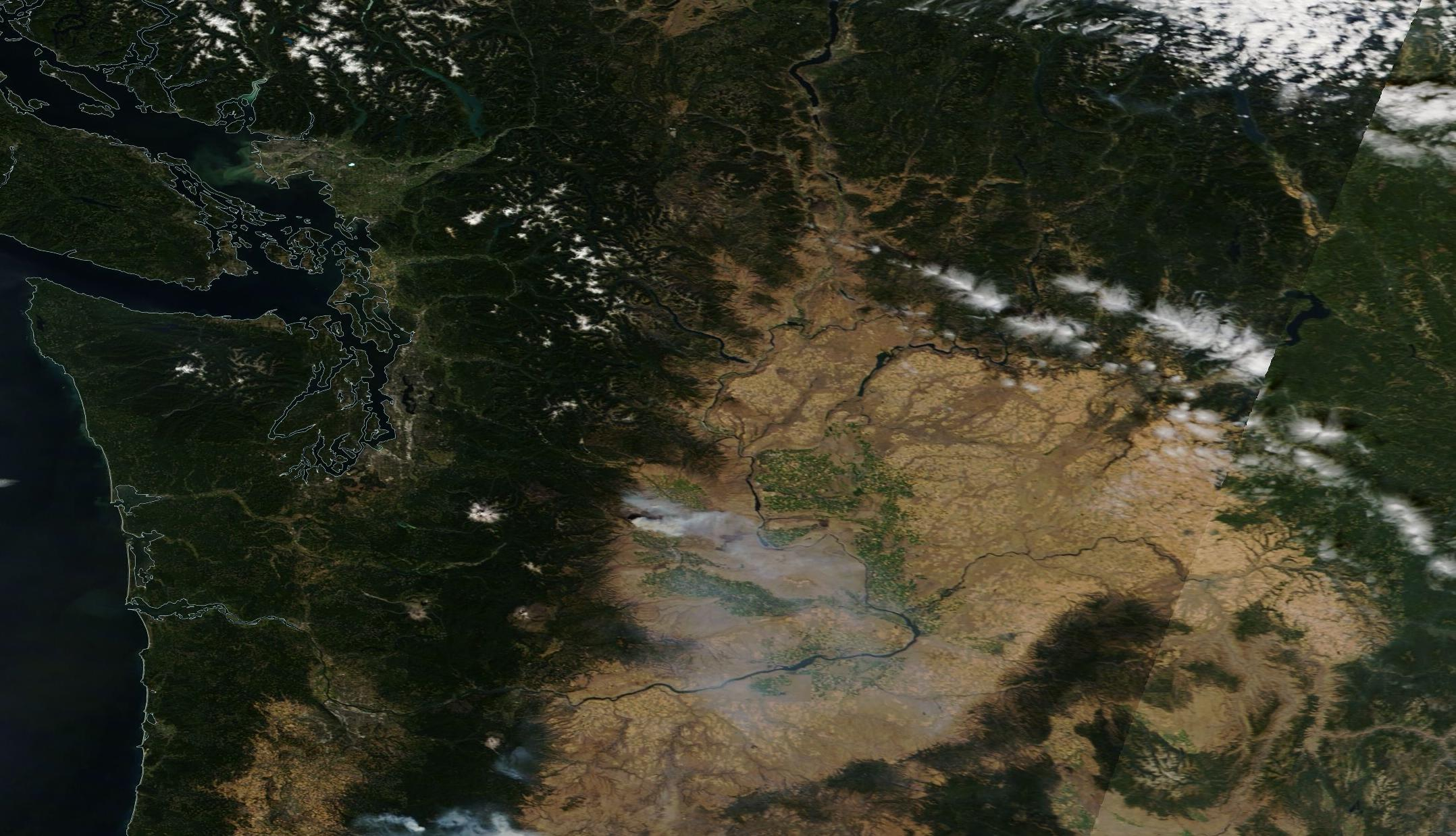
- Satellite image of smoke from the fire in central Washington State on September 3
- Date: August 31, 2020 –
- Location: Naches, Yakima County and Kittitas County, Washington, United States
- Coordinates: 46.854°N 120.799°W

Statistics
- Burned area: 69,920 acres (28,296 ha) (as of September 4, 2020)

Ignition
- Cause: Under investigation

Map
- Location in Washington

The Evans Canyon Fire, ignited about eight miles north of Naches, Washington, during the afternoon of August 31, 2020. The wildfire expanded by 8,900 acres to almost 13,000 acres between September 1 and 2, then grew to 30,000 acres on September 2. Evacuations of over 400 homes began on September 1 and the entire Yakima River Canyon was closed to recreation, while the city of Selah was threatened. By September 2,900 homes had been evacuated. By the morning of September 3, it had grown to 52,000 acres, 900 homes were ordered evacuated, State Route 821 in the Yakima River Canyon was closed down, and air quality in Yakima County was deemed unhealthy due to smoke. By September 6, it had burned almost 76,000 acres and was 40% contained.
