= Malden, Washington =

- Town
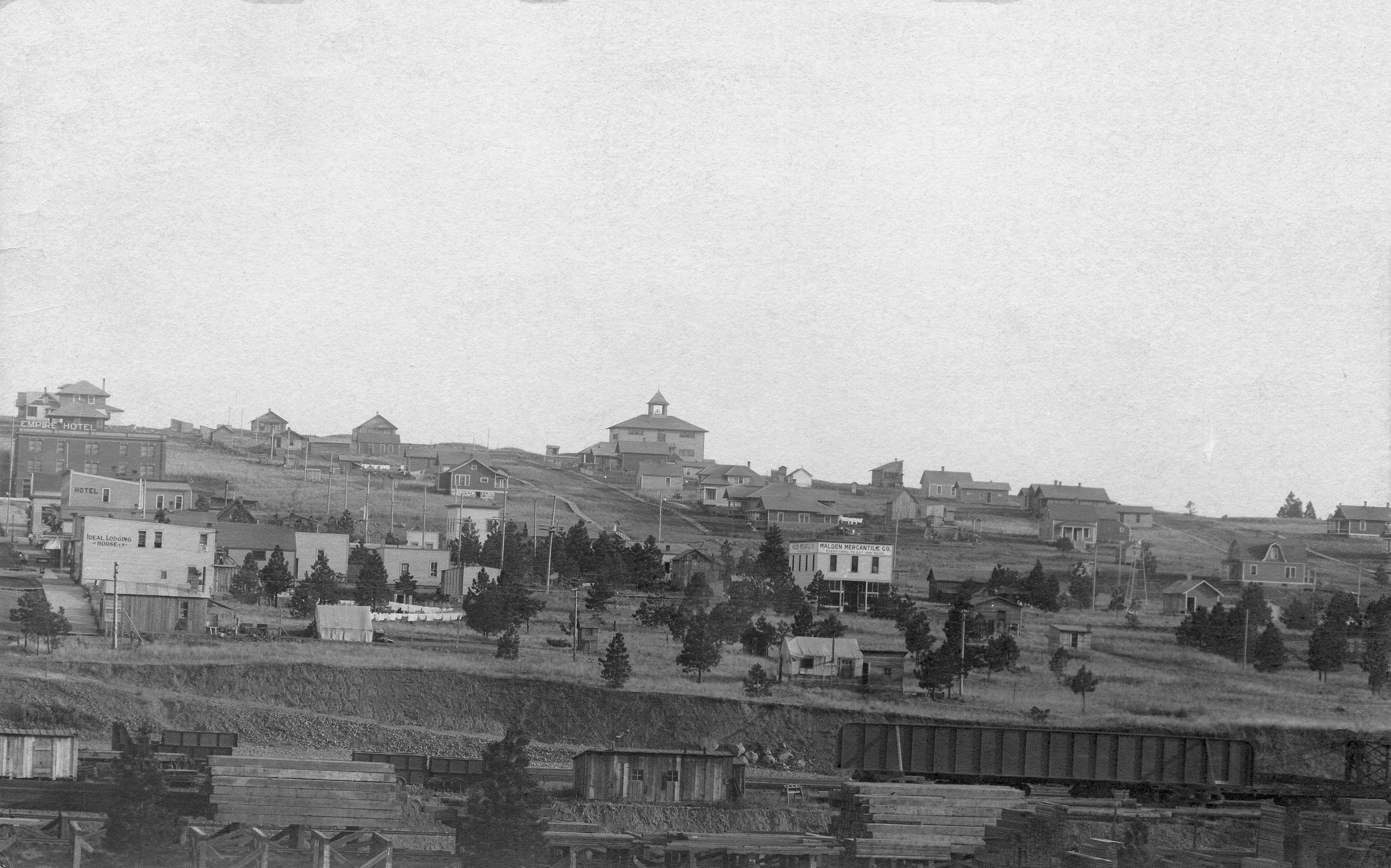
- Malden (1912)

- Location within Washington and Whitman County
- Coordinates: 47°13′37″N 117°28′23″W
- Country: United States
- State: Washington
- County: Whitman

Area
  - Total: 0.66 sq mi (1.70 km^{2})
  - Land: 0.66 sq mi (1.70 km^{2})
  - Water: 0 sq mi (0.00 km^{2})
- Elevation: 2,126 ft (648 m)

Population (2020)
  - Total: 216
  - Density: 329/sq mi (127/km^{2})
- Time zone: UTC-8 (Pacific (PST))
  - Summer (DST): UTC-7 (PDT)
- ZIP code: 99149
- Area code: 509
- FIPS code: 53-42275
- GNIS feature ID: 2412933
- Website: maldenwaorg.wordpress.com

Malden is a town in Whitman County, eastern Washington, United States. The population was 216 at the 2020 census. 80 percent of the buildings were destroyed by a wildfire on September 7, 2020.

== History ==
Malden was officially incorporated on December 20, 1909. Established as a station stop, it was named by railway officials after Malden, Massachusetts. The rural town had a small population.

On September 7, 2020, a large wildfire destroyed approximately 80 percent of buildings in Malden and nearby Pine City. The town's fire station, post office, city hall, library, Masonic Lodge, and several houses were among the buildings destroyed. Most of the town's population was evacuated as the fire approached, while access after the fire was restricted due to a leaking propane tank.

== Geography ==
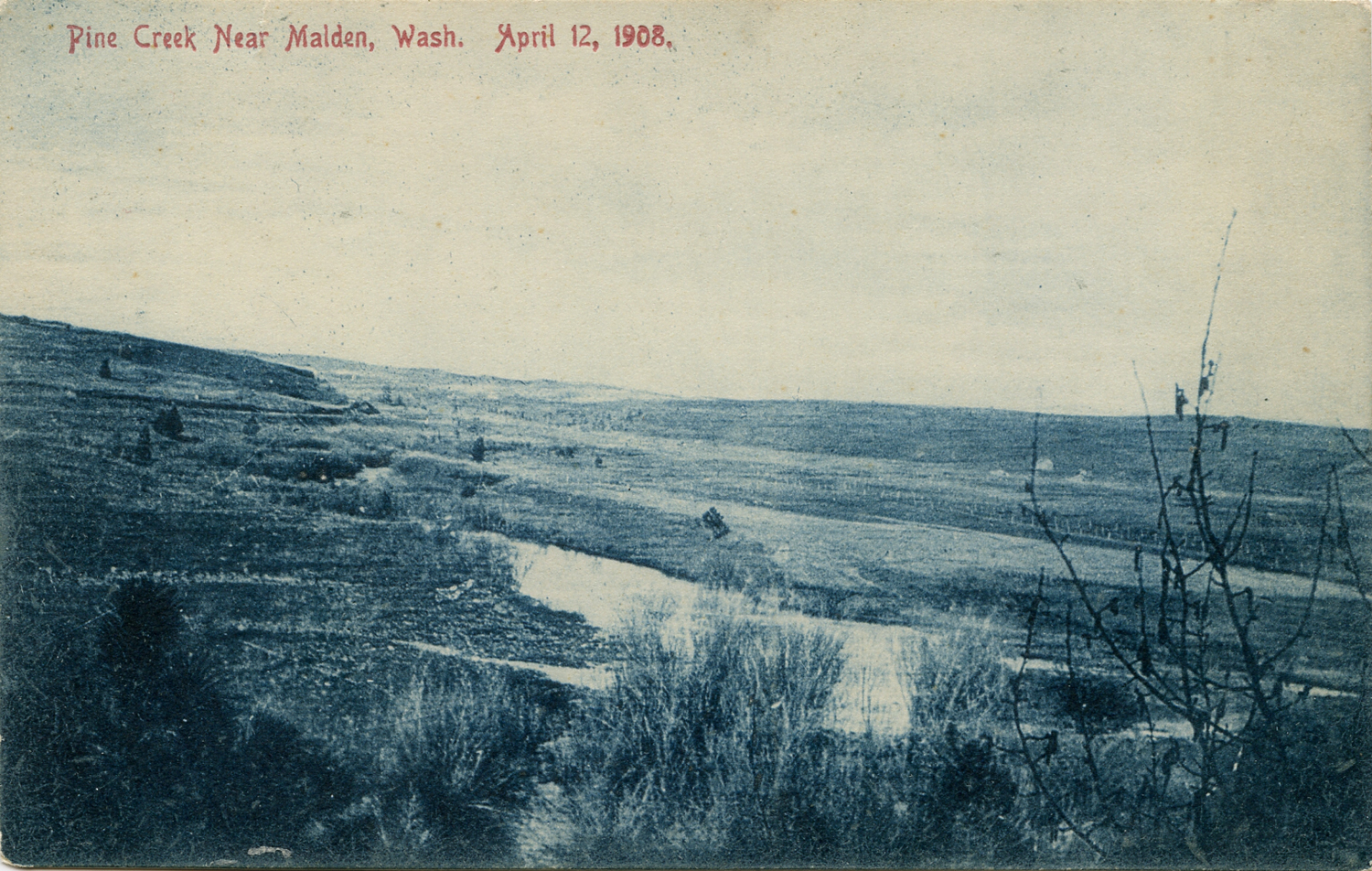
Pine Creek in 1908

According to the United States Census Bureau, the town has a total area of 0.67 square miles (1.74 km^{2}), all of it land.

=== Climate ===
This region experiences warm (but not hot) and dry summers, with no average monthly temperatures above 71.6 °F. According to the Köppen Climate Classification system, Malden has a warm-summer Mediterranean climate, abbreviated "Csb" on climate maps.

== Demographics ==
Historical population
Census	Pop.	Note	%±
1910	798		—
1920	1,005		25.9%
1930	375		−62.7%
1940	325		−13.3%
1950	332		2.2%
1960	292		−12.0%
1970	219		−25.0%
1980	200		−8.7%
1990	189		−5.5%
2000	215		13.8%
2010	203		−5.6%
2020	216		6.4%
U.S. Decennial Census

=== 2010 census ===
As of the 2010 census, there were 203 people, 90 households, and 57 families residing in the town. The population density was 303.0 inhabitants per square mile (117.0/km^{2}). There were 118 housing units at an average density of 176.1 per square mile (68.0/km^{2}). The racial makeup of the town was 92.1% White, 2.0% Native American, 1.0% from other races, and 4.9% from two or more races. Hispanic or Latino of any race were 3.9% of the population.

There were 90 households, of which 27.8% had children under the age of 18 living with them, 50.0% were married couples living together, 11.1% had a female householder with no husband present, 2.2% had a male householder with no wife present, and 36.7% were non-families. 34.4% of all households were made up of individuals, and 20% had someone living alone who was 65 years of age or older. The average household size was 2.26 and the average family size was 2.91.

The median age in the town was 50.8 years. 23.6% of residents were under the age of 18; 4% were between the ages of 18 and 24; 18.7% were from 25 to 44; 28.2% were from 45 to 64; and 25.6% were 65 years of age or older. The gender makeup of the town was 50.7% male and 49.3% female.

=== 2000 census ===
As of the 2000 census, there were 215 people, 93 households, and 65 families residing in the town. The population density was 326.1 people per square mile (125.8/km^{2}). There were 108 housing units at an average density of 163.8 per square mile (63.2/km^{2}). The racial makeup of the town was 96.28% White, 0.47% African American, 2.33% Native American, and 0.93% from two or more races. Hispanic or Latino of any race were 0.93% of the population.

There were 93 households, out of which 30.1% had children under the age of 18 living with them, 49.5% were married couples living together, 15.1% had a female householder with no husband present, and 30.1% were non-families. 29.0% of all households were made up of individuals, and 10.8% had someone living alone who was 65 years of age or older. The average household size was 2.31 and the average family size was 2.82.

In the town, the age distribution of the population shows 26.5% under the age of 18, 5.6% from 18 to 24, 23.3% from 25 to 44, 26.0% from 45 to 64, and 18.6% who were 65 years of age or older. The median age was 42 years. For every 100 females, there were 90.3 males. For every 100 females age 18 and over, there were 92.7 males.

The median income for a household in the town was $26,250, and the median income for a family was $26,250. Males had a median income of $30,000 versus $31,250 for females. The per capita income for the town was $12,477. About 18.0% of families and 17.4% of the population were below the poverty line, including 17.9% of those under the age of eighteen and 4.7% of those 65 or over.
