= 2020 California wildfires =

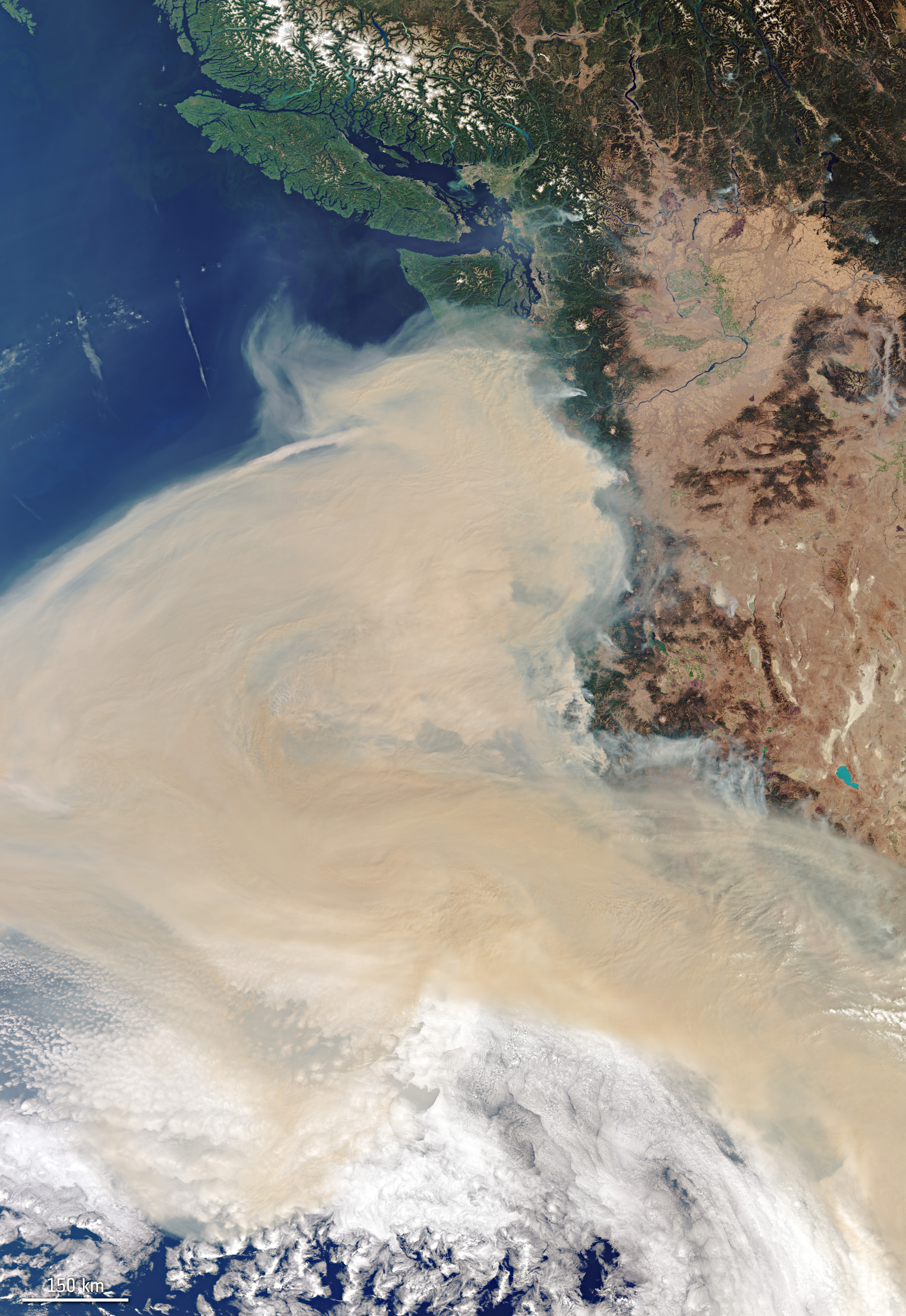
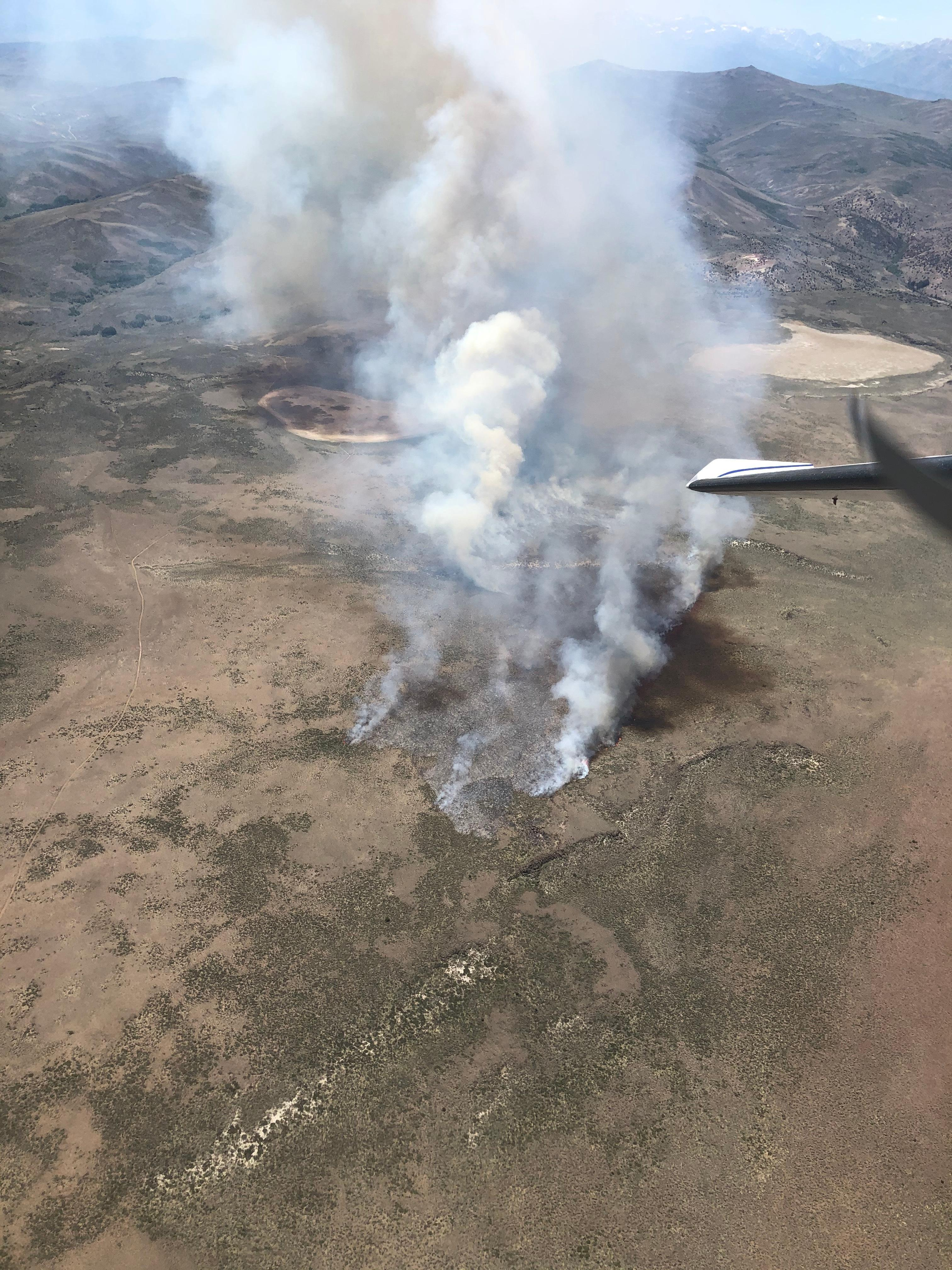
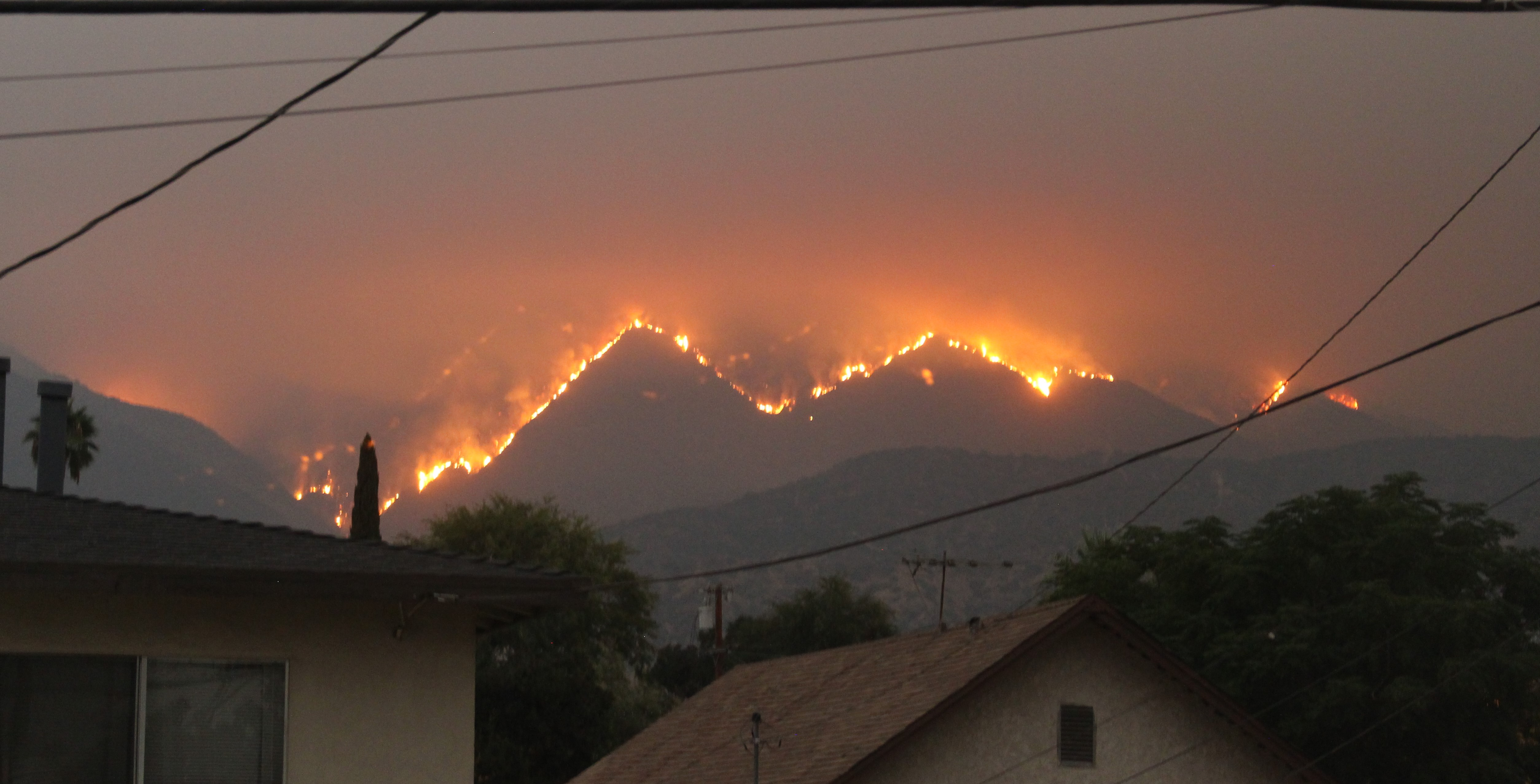
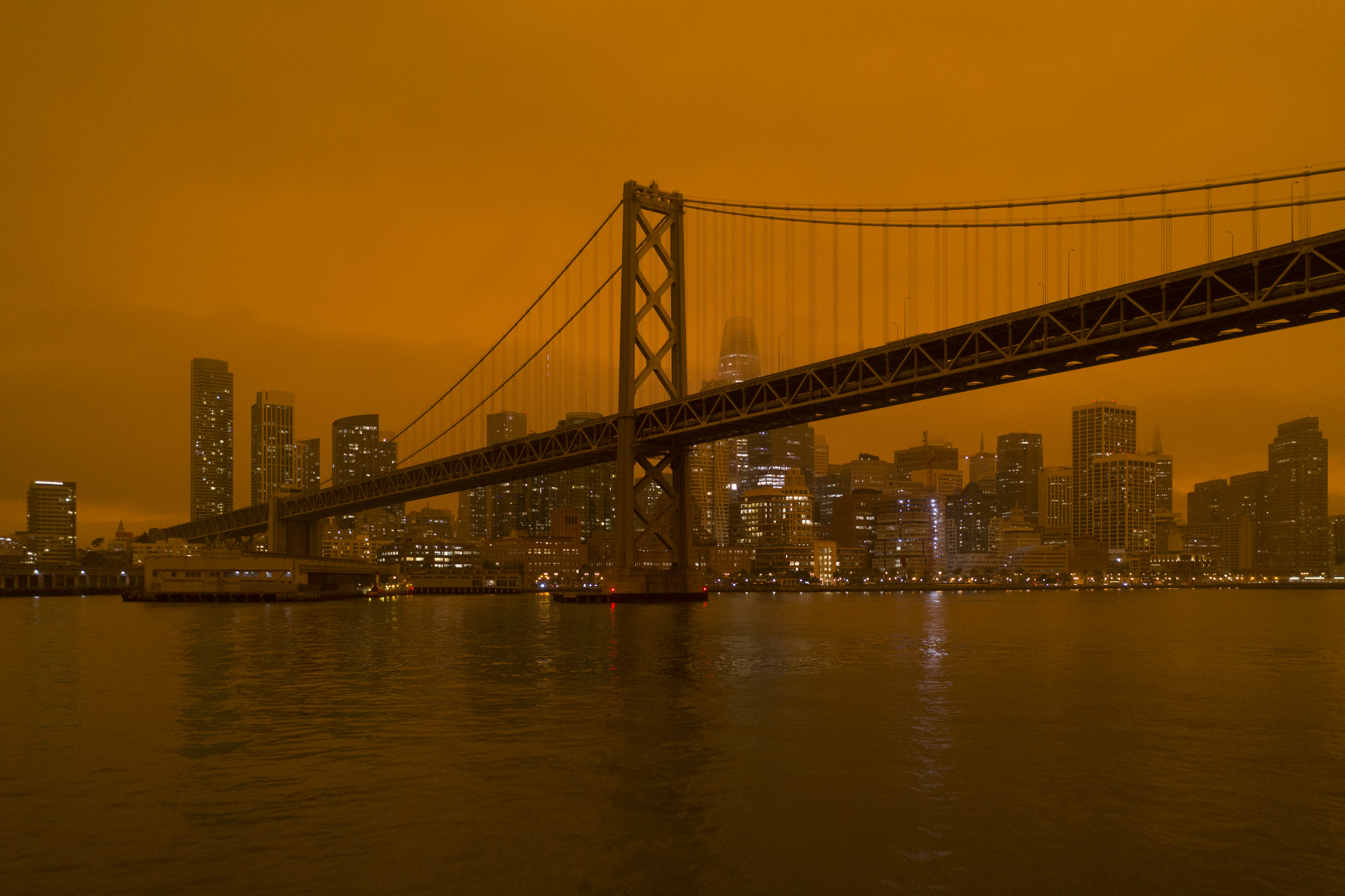
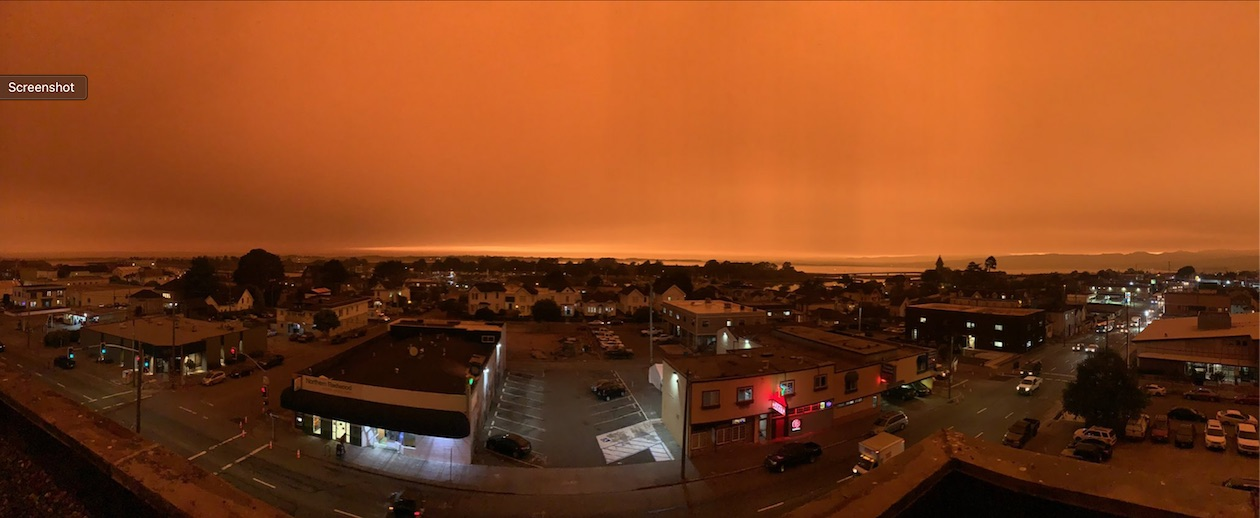
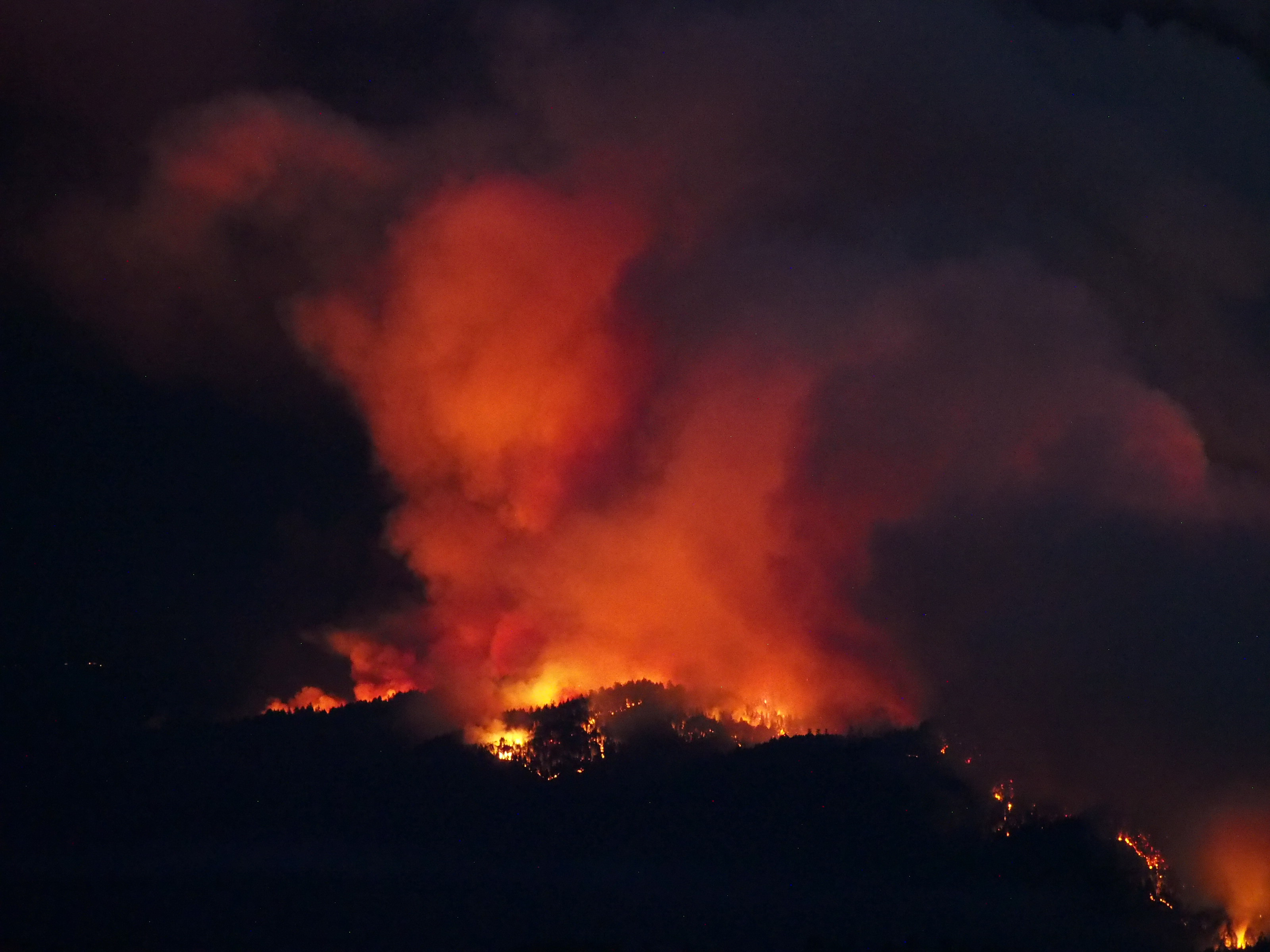
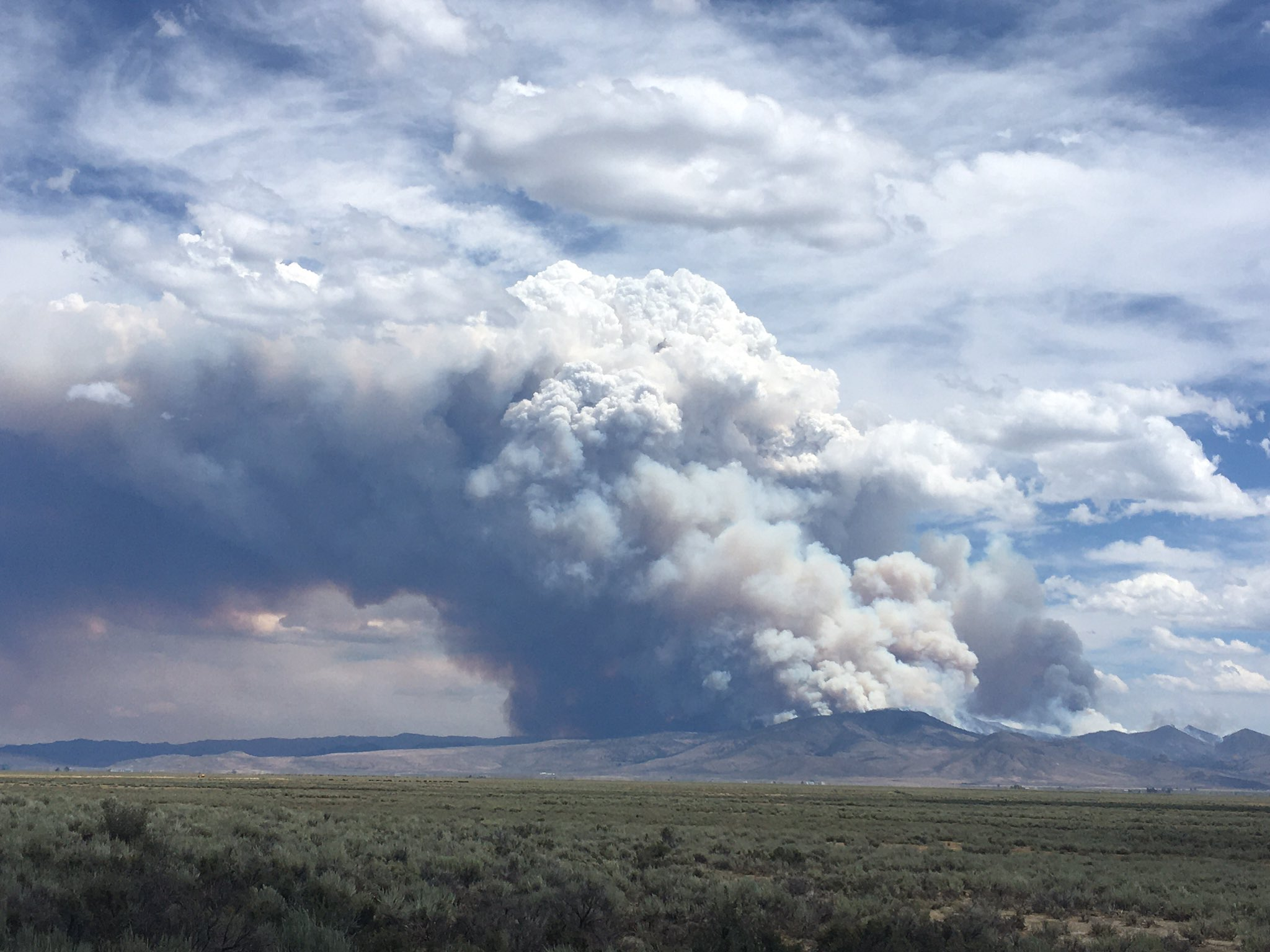
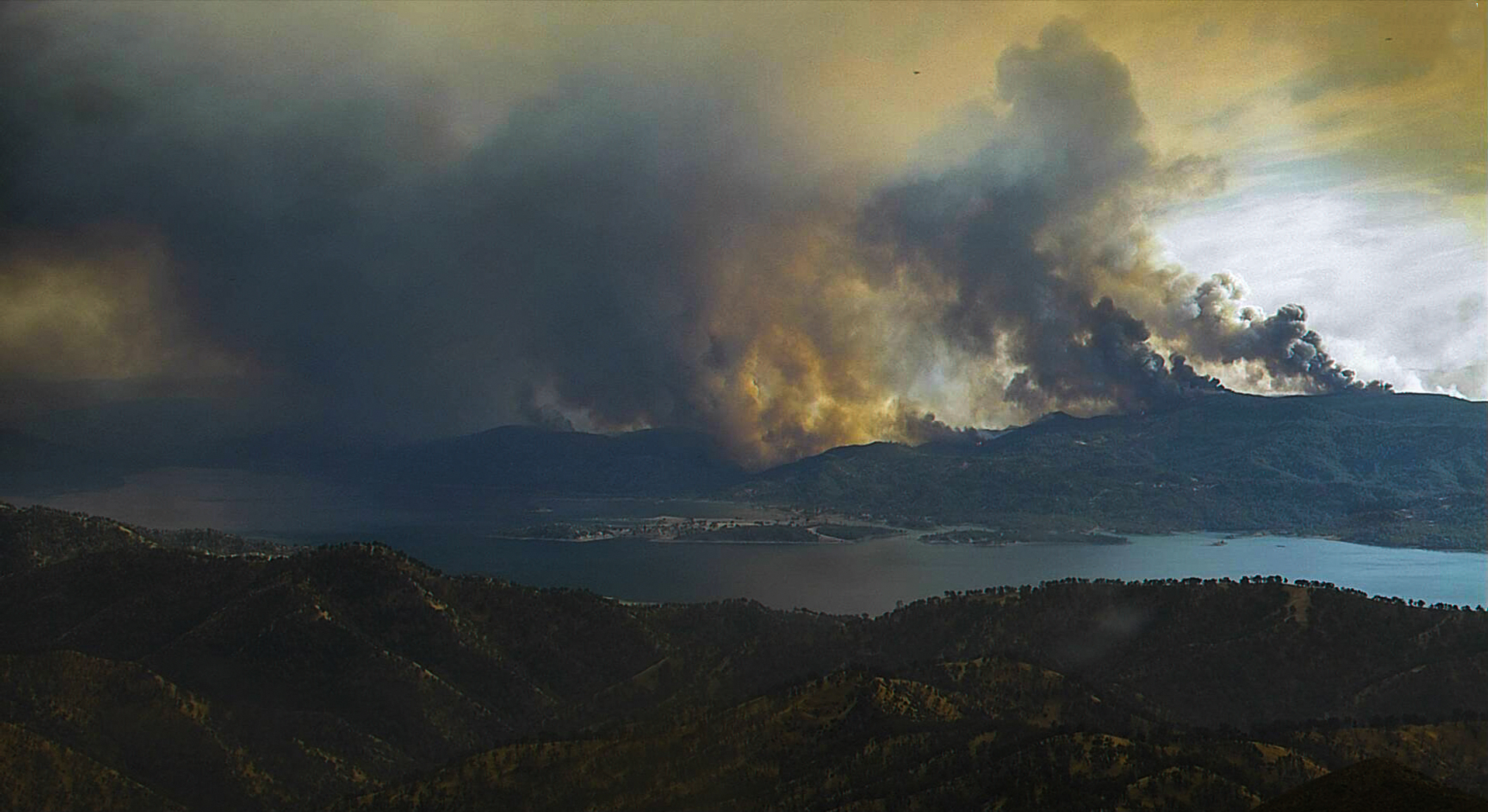
- From top to bottom, and left to right; September 10 satellite image of the wildfires burning in California and Oregon; The Aurora Fire on June 26, 2020; The Bobcat Fire burning in the San Gabriel mountains near Monrovia; Smoke from the North Complex over the Bay Bridge at noon on September 9; An orange sky over Eureka on Sept 9; The CZU Lightning Complex fires along Butano Ridge on August 18; The Loyalton Fire near Calpine; The Hennessey and Spanish Fires burn towards Lake Berryessa on August 18, 2020
- Date: February 15, 2020 – January 5, 2021

Statistics
- Total fires: 8,648
- Total area: 4,304,379 acres (1,741,920 ha)

Impacts
- Deaths: 33
- Injuries: 37
- Structures destroyed: 11,116 (Cal Fire); 9,211 (NIFC)
- Cost: >$12.079 billion (2020 USD) (Third-costliest on record)

Map
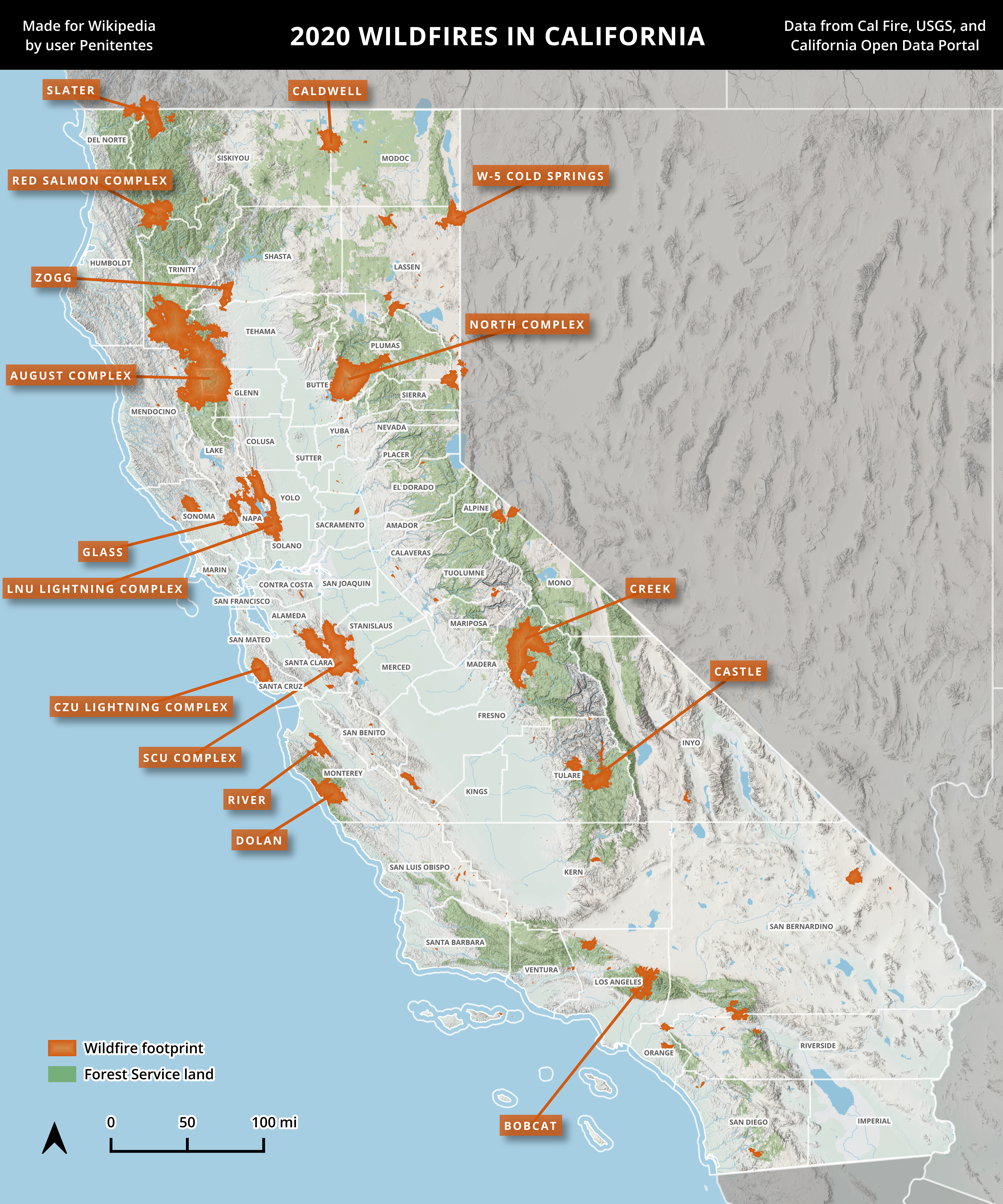
- A map of wildfires in California in 2020, using Cal Fire data

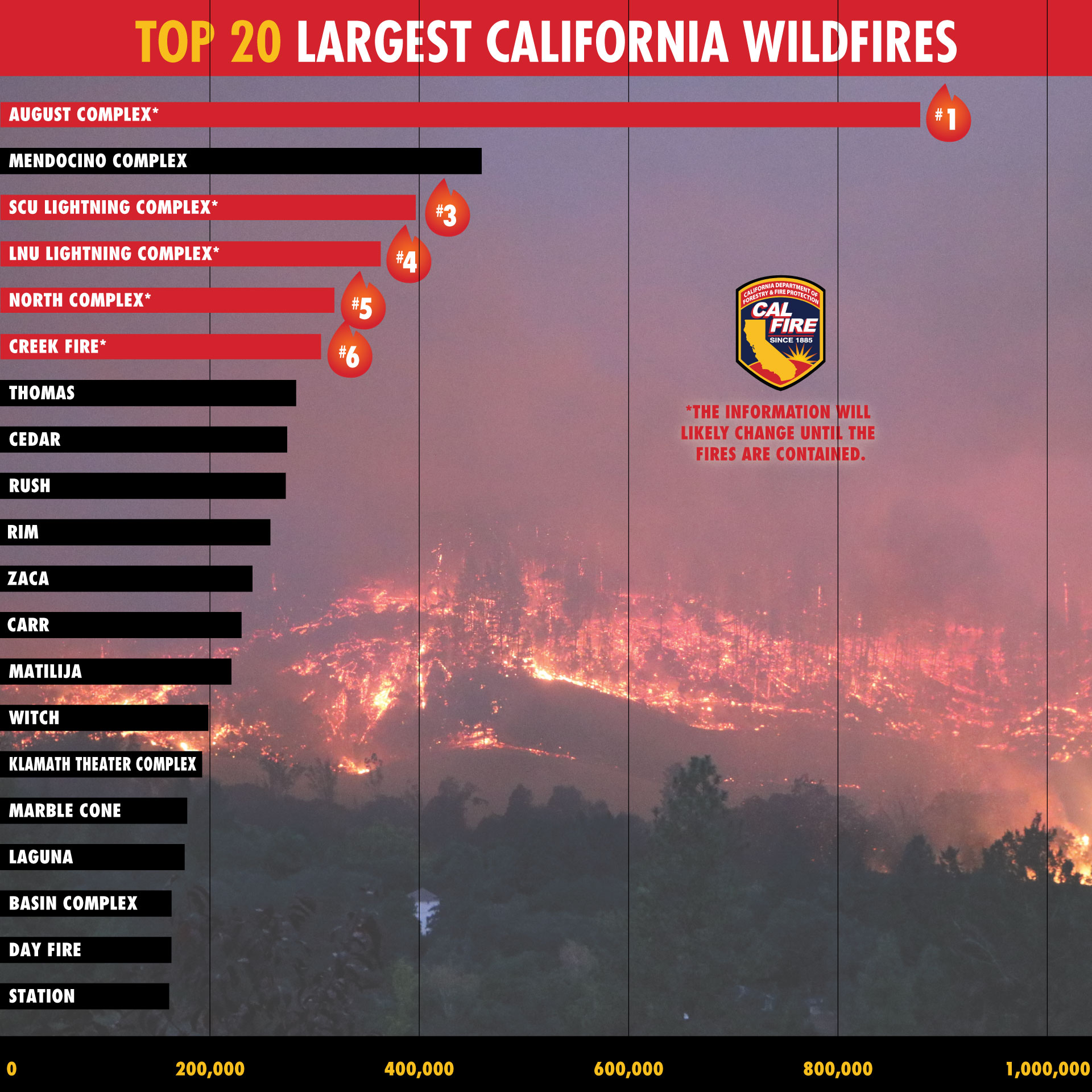
Five of the twenty largest wildfires in California history were part of the 2020 wildfire season.

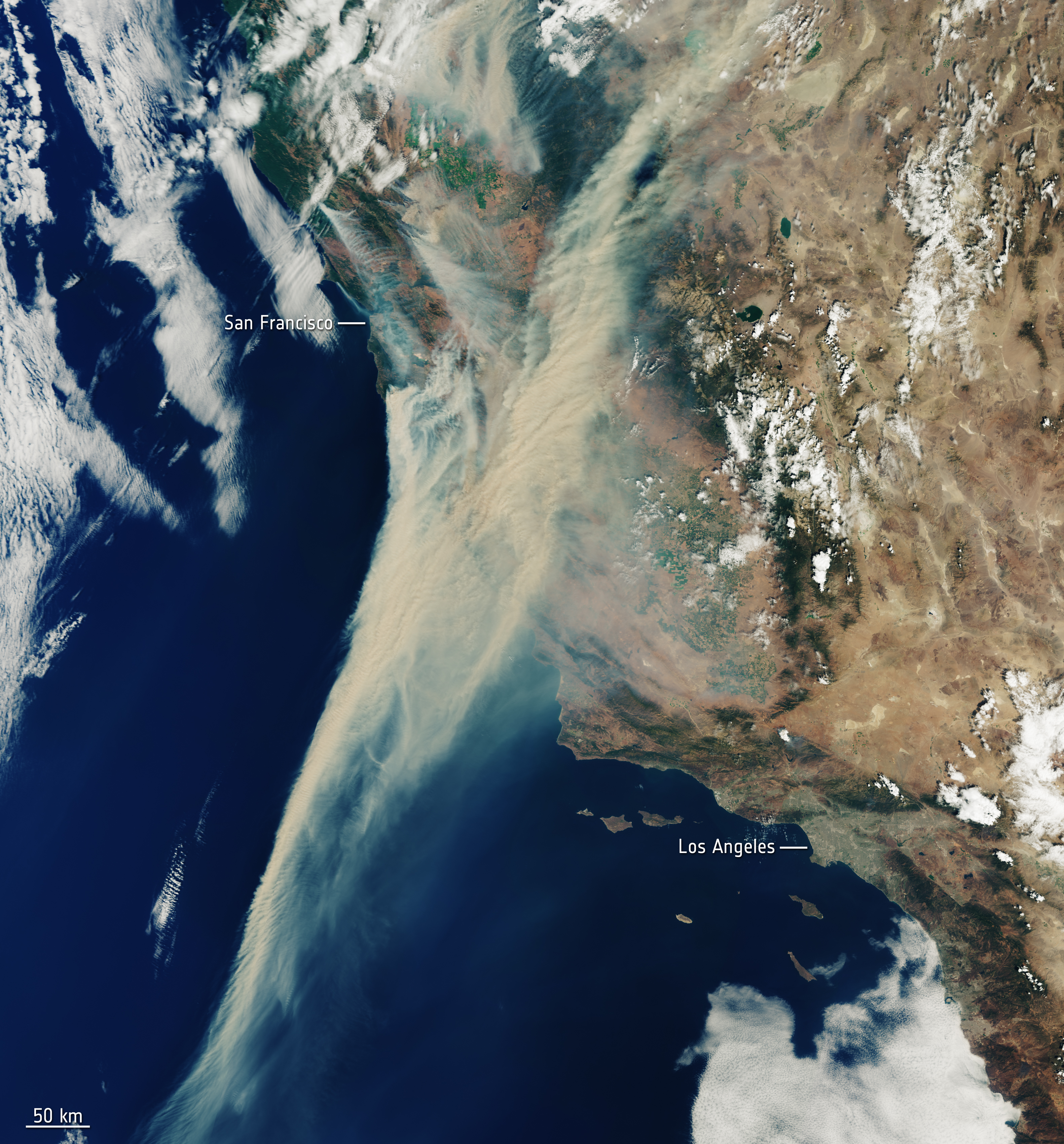
An August 19, 2020 satellite image of the wildfires burning in Northern California, covering a significant portion of California and nearby states.

2020 was a record-setting year for wildfires in California. Over the course of the year, 8,648 fires burned 4,304,379 acres (1,741,920 ha), more than four percent of the state's roughly 100 million acres of land, making 2020 the largest wildfire season recorded in California's modern history. However, it is roughly equivalent to the pre-1800 levels which averaged around 4.4 million acres yearly and up to 12 million in peak years. California's August Complex fire has been described as the first "gigafire", burning over 1 million acres across seven counties, an area larger than the state of Rhode Island. The fires destroyed over 10,000 structures and cost over $12.079 billion (2020 USD) in damages, including over $10 billion in property damage and $2.079 billion in fire suppression costs. The intensity of the fire season has been attributed to a combination of more than a century of poor forest management and higher temperatures resulting from climate change.

On August 18, 2020, Governor Gavin Newsom declared a state of emergency, and on August 19, 2020, reported that the state was battling 367 known fires, many sparked by intense thunderstorms on August 16–17 caused by moisture from the remnants of Tropical Storm Fausto. Response and evacuations were complicated by a historic heatwave and the ongoing COVID-19 pandemic. On August 22, 2020, President Donald Trump issued a major disaster declaration (DR-4558), which provides Individual Assistance and/or Public Assistance.

In early September 2020, a combination of a record-breaking heat wave and strong katabatic winds (including the Jarbo, Diablo, and Santa Ana), caused explosive fire growth. The August Complex became California's largest recorded wildfire. The Creek Fire expanded in the Big Creek drainage area, temporarily trapping hundreds of campers near the Mammoth Pool Reservoir. The North Complex explosively grew in size as the winds fanned it westward, threatening the city of Oroville, triggering mass evacuations, and causing 16 fatalities.

Governor Newsom's request for a federal disaster declaration for six major wildfires was approved on October 17, 2020 after having been rejected the previous day by the Trump administration.

== Background ==
The timing of "fire season" in California is variable, depending on the amount of prior winter and spring precipitation, the frequency and severity of weather such as heat waves and wind events, and moisture content in vegetation. Northern California typically sees wildfire activity between late spring and early fall, peaking in the summer with hotter and drier conditions. Occasional cold frontal passages can bring wind and lightning. The timing of fire season in Southern California is similar, peaking between late spring and fall. The severity and duration of peak activity in either part of the state is modulated in part by weather events: downslope/offshore wind events can lead to critical fire weather, while onshore flow and Pacific weather systems can bring conditions that hamper wildfire growth.

== Early outlook ==
Early in the year, there was a concern for the 2020 fire season to potentially be prolonged and especially grave, due to the unusually dry months of January and February, one of the driest such periods of any calendar year on record. On March 22, 2020, a state of emergency was declared by California Governor Gavin Newsom due to a mass die-off of trees throughout the state, potentially increasing the risk of wildfires. However, throughout March and April, rain began to consistently fall in the state, which alleviated the drought conditions. Despite this, Northern California was still expected to have severe wildfire conditions due to the moderate or severe drought conditions in the area, whereas Central and Southern California were expected to have serious fire conditions later in the year due to the late wet season and precipitation.

On June 18, 2020, climate scientist Daniel Swain predicted the 2020 Arizona wildfire season was a sign of what was to come in California, due to similar drought and weather conditions between Arizona and Northern California.

== Seasonal fire risk ==
External videos
- "What are California megafires? Things to Know", 11.20.2019, Knowable Magazine

The year 2020 was the largest wildfire year recorded in California history, according to the California Department of Forestry and Fire Protection. From a historical perspective, the average annual acres burned prior to 1850 were probably significantly larger than years since reliable fire records began. Scott Stephens, a professor of fire science at UC Berkeley, estimated that prior to 1850, about 4,500,000 acres (1,800,000 ha) burned yearly, in fires that lasted for months. Activity peaked roughly every 30 years, with up to 11,800,000 acres (4,800,000 ha) burning during peak years. The indigenous peoples of California historically set controlled burns and allowed natural fires to run their course.

The peak of the wildfire season usually occurs between July and November when hot, dry winds are most frequent. The wildfire season typically does not end until the first significant rainstorm of autumn arrives, which is usually around October in Northern California, and early November in Southern California.

As wildfire becomes more frequent, the wildland–urban interface has increasingly become more dangerous when it comes to property damage and risk to life.

== Causes ==
=== Land development and forest management ===
Scientists believe that, prior to development, California fires regularly burned significantly more acreage than has been seen in recent history. Wildfires have been aggressively suppressed in recent years, resulting in a buildup of fuel, increasing the risk of large uncontrollable fires. There is broad scientific consensus that there should be more controlled burning of forests in California in order to reduce fire risk. A 2020 ProPublica investigation blames a combination of climate change and a history of insufficient controlled burning for the increase in "megafires." A sharp increase in the population and development of fire-prone areas has also contributed to the increase in flammable tinder.

=== Climate change ===
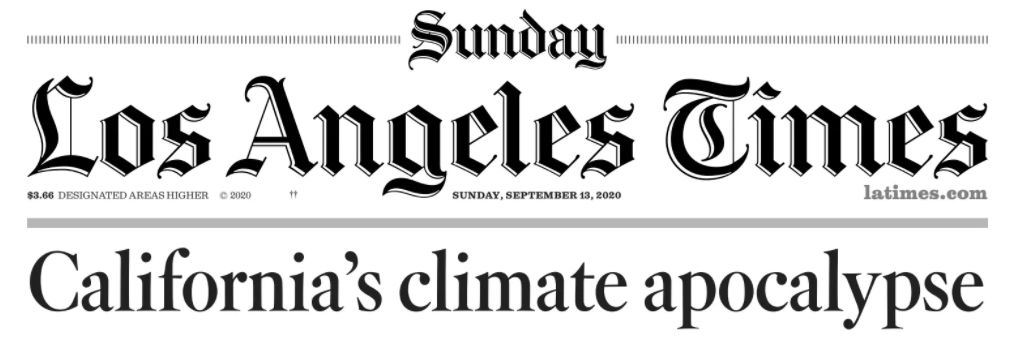
The Los Angeles Times on 13 September described the fire as a climate apocalypse.

Climate change increases the temperature of wildfires in California, the risk for drought, and potentially also the frequency of such events. David Romps, director of the Berkeley Atmospheric Sciences Center summarizes the situation as follows: "To cut to the chase: Were the heat wave and the lightning strikes and the dryness of the vegetation affected by global warming? Absolutely yes. Were they made significantly hotter, more numerous, and drier because of global warming? Yes, likely yes, and yes."

Similarly, Friederike Otto, acting director of the University of Oxford Environmental Change Institute states, "There is absolutely no doubt that the extremely high temperatures are higher than they would have been without human-induced climate change. A huge body of attribution literature demonstrates now that climate change is an absolute game-changer when it comes to heat waves, and California won't be the exception." Susan Clark, director of the Sustainability Initiative at the University at Buffalo argues, "This is climate change. This increased intensity and frequency of temperatures and heat waves are part of the projections for the future. [...] There is going to be more morbidity and mortality [from heat.] There are going to be more extremes."

The National Interagency Fire Center's (NFIC) National Interagency Coordination (NICC) reported that monthly outlooks for the entire country will still drive wildfires across the country but especially California. The main drivers through fall and winter seasons will be La Nina, and drought conditions are going to continue through California, causing the wildfires to continue. The shift will start from Northern California to Southern California as precipitation will lessen the impact of wildfires across northern California.

=== Arson ===
In August 2020, a suspect was charged by the Monterey County Sheriff with arson relating to the Dolan Fire; however, this has not been officially determined as the cause of the fire. In April 2021, another suspect, already arrested and charged for the murder of a woman, was charged with arson relating to the Markley Fire, one of the wildfires involving in the LNU Lightning Complex fires; according to authorities, the fire was set to cover up the aforementioned murder. Arson has also been suspected as the cause of the Ranch 2 Fire in Los Angeles County.

== Effects ==
A 2023 study found that these wildfires are affecting the California ecosystem and disrupting the habitats. It found that in the 2020 and 2021 fire seasons 58% of the area affected by wildfires occurred in those two seasons since 2012. These two fires destroyed 30% of the habitat of 50 species as well as 100 species that had 10% of their habitats burn. 5-14% of the species' habitats burned at a "high severity."Over 19000 sq.kms of vegetation burned affecting the habitat of more than 508 vertebrate species. A study based on patient data between July and December 2020 found an association between the exposure to wildfire smoke with increased odds of ED visits for mental health conditions.

== List of wildfires ==
The Government of California's video about COVID-19 protocols in place at wildfire evacuation centers.

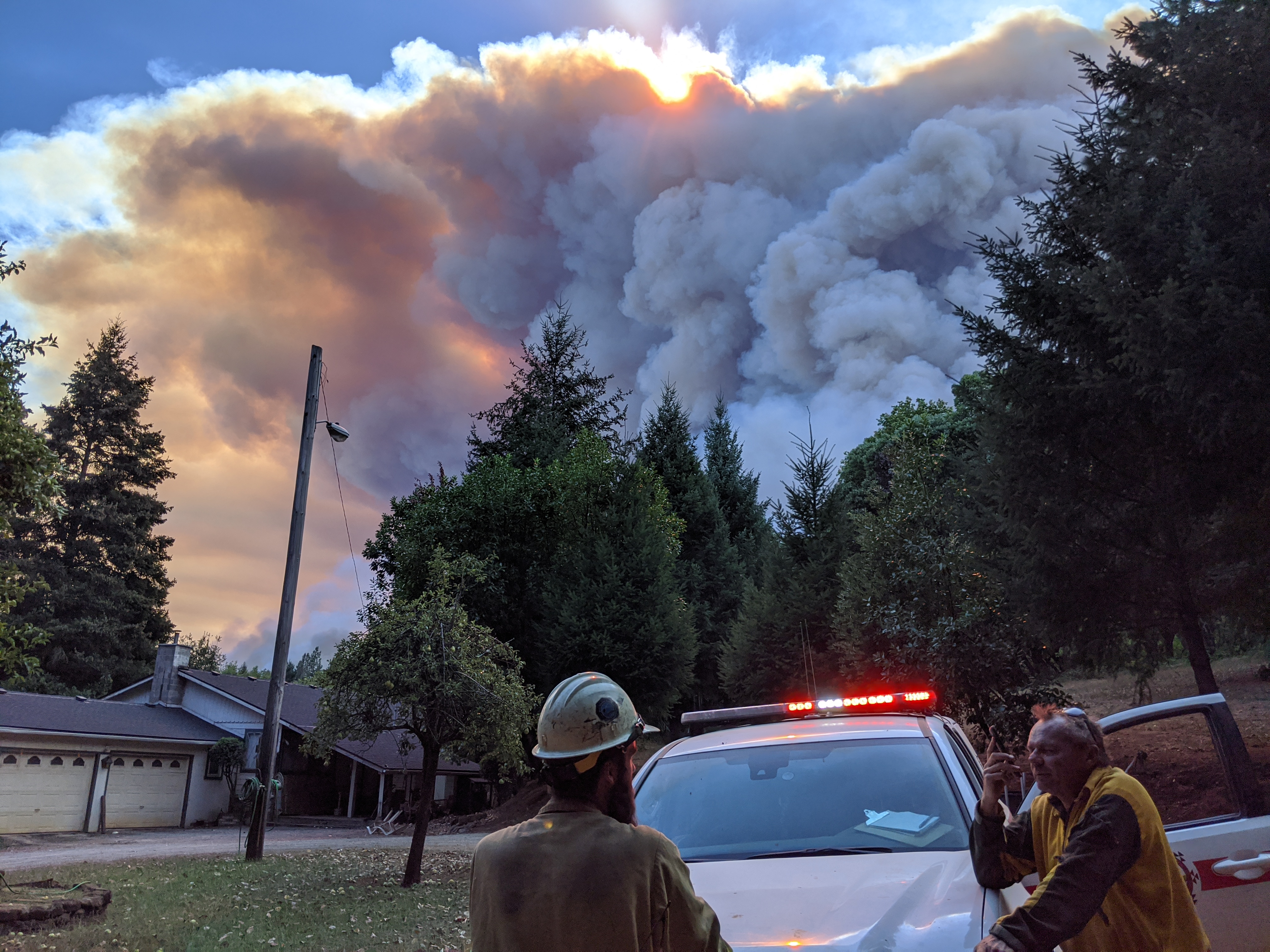
Smoke from the Slater fire on September 8

The following is a list of fires that burned more than 1,000 acres (400 ha), or produced significant structural damage or casualties.

Name	County	Acres	Start date	Containment date (Note: Containment means that fire crews have established and secured control lines around the fire's perimeter. These lines are artificial barriers, like trenches or cleared vegetation, designed to stop the fire's spread, or natural barriers like rivers. Containment reflects progress in managing the fire but does not necessarily mean the fire is starved of fuel, under control, or put out.)	Notes	Ref
Interstate 5	Kings	2,060	May 3	May 7		
Range	San Luis Obispo	5,000	May 27	May 28		
Scorpion	Santa Barbara	1,395	May 31	June 1		
Quail	Solano	1,837	June 6	June 10	3 structures destroyed	
Wood	San Diego	11,000	June 8	June 12	Burned on Camp Pendleton	
India	San Diego	1,100	June 8	June 14	Burned on Camp Pendleton	
Soda	San Luis Obispo	1,672	June 10	June 11	2 structures destroyed	
Grant	Sacramento	5,042	June 12	June 17	1 structure damaged	
Walker	Calaveras	1,455	June 16	June 20	2 structures destroyed	
Grade	Tulare	1,050	June 22	June 26		
Pass	Merced	2,192	June 28	June 30		
Bena	Kern	2,900	July 1	July 3		
Crews	Santa Clara	5,513	July 5	July 13	1 structure destroyed; 1 damaged; 1 injury. Resulted in evacuations of rural Gilroy.	
Soledad	Los Angeles	1,525	July 5	July 15	1 injury, caused by fireworks	
Mineral	Fresno	29,667	July 13	July 26	7 structures destroyed	
Coyote	San Benito	1,508	July 15	July 18		
Hog	Lassen	9,564	July 18	August 8	2 structures destroyed	
Gold	Lassen	22,634	July 20	August 8	13 structures destroyed; 5 structures damaged; 2 firefighters injured in burnover	
July Complex 2020	Modoc, Siskiyou	83,261	July 22	August 7	1 structure destroyed; 3 outbuildings destroyed	
Blue Jay	Mariposa, Tuolumne	6,922	July 24	November 20	Lightning-sparked, 1 structure destroyed.	
Red Salmon Complex	Humboldt, Siskiyou, Trinity	144,698	July 26	November 17	Originally started as both the Red and Salmon fire (both started by lightning strikes), but have since merged into one fire	
Branch	San Luis Obispo	3,022	July 28	August 1	Started near CA 58	
Apple	Riverside	33,424	July 31	November 18	4 structures destroyed; 8 outbuildings destroyed; 4 injuries	
Pond	San Luis Obispo	1,962	August 1	August 8	1 structure destroyed; 1 damaged; 13 outbuildings destroyed	
North	Lassen	6,882	August 2	August 10	6,882 acres in total, of which approximately 4,105 acres burned in Washoe County, Nevada	
Stagecoach	Kern	7,760	August 3	August 16	23 structures destroyed; 4 damaged; 25 outbuildings destroyed; 2 damaged; 1 firefighter fatality	
Wolf	Tuolumne	2,057	August 11	November 19	Lightning-sparked	
Lake	Los Angeles	31,089	August 12	September 28	Lightning-sparked, 33 structures destroyed; 6 damaged; 21 outbuildings destroyed; 2 injuries	
Ranch 2	Los Angeles	4,237	August 13	October 5	Human-caused, suspected arson	
Hills	Fresno	2,121	August 15	August 24	Lightning-sparked; 1 fatality	
Loyalton	Lassen, Plumas, Sierra	47,029	August 15	September 14	Lightning-sparked, caused National Weather Service to issue first ever Fire Tornado Warning; 5 homes, 6 outbuildings destroyed	
Beach	Mono	3,780	August 16	August 28	Lightning-sparked	
River	Monterey	48,088	August 16	September 4	Lightning-sparked; 30 structures destroyed; 13 structures damaged; 4 injuries	
Dome	San Bernardino	43,273	August 16	September 14	Lightning-sparked, burned in the Mojave National Preserve; 6 structures destroyed and 1.3+ million Joshua trees killed	
CZU Lightning Complex	San Mateo, Santa Cruz	86,509	August 16	September 22	Several lightning-sparked fires burning close together across San Mateo and Santa Cruz Counties; 1,490 structures destroyed; 140 structures damaged; 1 injury; 1 fatality.	
SCU Lightning Complex	Santa Clara, Alameda, Contra Costa, San Joaquin, Merced, Stanislaus	396,624	August 16	October 1	Deer Zone, Marsh, Canyon Zone and other surrounding fires combined into one multi-fire incident by CalFire; all believed to have been sparked by an intense and widespread lightning storm; 222 structures destroyed; 26 structures damaged; 6 injuries. It is the third-largest fire complex in California history.	
August Complex	Glenn, Mendocino, Lake, Tehama, Trinity, Shasta	1,032,648	August 16	November 12	Information for the August Complex as a whole. Originally 38 separate fires, which later merged to become California's largest recorded wildfire. Main fires were the Doe and Elkhorn Fires, which merged on September 11. One firefighter fatality; 2 injuries; 935 structures destroyed; 5 structures damaged.	
Rattlesnake	Tulare	8,419	August 16	December 29	Lightning sparked a slow-growing fire in inaccessible terrain.	
LNU Lightning Complex	Colusa, Lake, Napa, Sonoma, Solano, Yolo	363,220	August 17	October 2	Multi-fire incident that includes the Hennessey Fire (305,651 acres), the Walbridge Fire (55,209 acres), and the Meyers Fire (2,360 acres) sparked by lightning; 1,491 structures destroyed; 232 structures damaged; 5 injuries; 6 fatalities. It is the fifth-largest fire complex in California history.	
Holser	Ventura	3,000	August 17	September 6	Unknown cause	
Butte/Tehama/Glenn Lightning Complex (Butte Zone)	Butte	19,609	August 17	October 17	Lightning sparked 34 fires throughout Butte County; 14 structures destroyed; 1 structure damaged; 1 injury	
North Complex	Plumas, Butte	318,935	August 17	December 3	Lightning sparked, includes the Claremont Fire and the Bear Fire; 2,342 structures destroyed; 113 structures damaged; 16 fatalities; 13 injuries; It is the sixth-largest fire in California history and scorched more than 300,000 acres of land.	
Jones	Nevada	705	August 17	August 28	Lightning sparked, 21 structures destroyed, 3 structures damaged, 7 injuries	
Sheep	Plumas, Lassen	29,570	August 17	September 9	Lightning-sparked, 26 structures destroyed, 1 injury	
Salt	Calaveras	1,789	August 18	August 24	Lightning-sparked	
W-5 Cold Springs	Lassen, Modoc	84,817	August 18	September 14	Lightning-sparked. Fire spread eastward into Washoe County, Nevada.	
Carmel	Monterey	6,905	August 18	September 4	Lightning-sparked, 73 structures destroyed; 7 structures damaged	
Dolan	Monterey	124,924	August 18	December 31	Cause not officially determined; however, a suspect was charged with arson in connection to the fire; 19 structures destroyed.	
Woodward	Marin	4,929	August 19	October 2	Lightning-sparked	
SQF Complex	Tulare	174,178	August 19	January 5	Lightning-sparked, contains the Castle Fire and the Shotgun Fire; 228 structures destroyed; 12 structures damaged; 15 injuries	
Moc	Tuolumne	2,857	August 20	August 30	Cause: Equipment	
Moraine	Fresno, Tulare	1,316	August 21	December 29	Lightning-sparked	
Slink	Alpine, Mono	26,759	August 29	November 8	Lightning-sparked	
Creek	Fresno, Madera	379,895	September 4	December 24	856 structures destroyed, 71 structures damaged; 15 injuries; At the time, it was the fourth-largest fire and the largest single (non-complex) fire in California history (surpassed by the Dixie Fire in 2021).	
El Dorado	San Bernardino, Riverside	22,744	September 5	November 16	Sparked by a pyrotechnic device at a gender reveal party. 10 structures destroyed, 5 structures damaged; 1 firefighter fatality; 13 injuries. Burned into the western perimeter of the Apple Fire on September 7.	
Valley	San Diego	16,390	September 5	September 24	61 structures destroyed, 11 structures damaged, 3 injuries	
Bobcat	Los Angeles	115,997	September 6	December 18	Caused by tree touching power line, 171 structures destroyed. One of the largest fires in Los Angeles County's history	
Oak	Mendocino	1,100	September 7	September 14	Unknown cause, 25 structures destroyed, 20 structures damaged	
Slater / Devil	Siskiyou, Del Norte	166,127	September 7	November 16	Includes the Slater Fire (157,270 acres, 100% contained on November 12) and the Devil Fire (8,857 acres, 100% contained on November 16). 2 fatalities; 440 structures destroyed. Spread northward into Josephine County, Oregon.	
Fork	El Dorado	1,673	September 8	November 9	Unknown cause	
Bullfrog	Fresno	1,185	September 9	November 9	Cause under investigation	
Willow	Yuba	1,311	September 9	September 14	41 structures destroyed, 10 structures damaged	
Fox	Siskiyou	2,188	September 14	September 29	Human-caused	
Snow	Riverside	6,254	September 17	October 6	Unknown cause	
Glass	Napa, Sonoma	67,484	September 27	October 20	Unknown cause; 1,555 structures destroyed; 280 structures damaged	
Zogg	Shasta	56,338	September 27	October 13	204 structures destroyed; 27 structures damaged; 4 fatalities, 1 injury; historic town of Ono destroyed	
Silverado	Orange	12,466	October 26	November 7	Downed SCE power line; 2 hand crew firefighters critically injured; over 90,000 people evacuated; 5 structures destroyed, 9 structures damaged	
Blue Ridge	Orange, San Bernardino, Riverside	13,694	October 26	November 7	Downed SCE power line; 1 structure destroyed, 10 structures damaged; at least 30,000 people evacuated	
Laura 2	Lassen	2,800	November 17	November 24	Unknown cause; 48 structures destroyed; 4 structures damaged	
Mountain View	Mono, Alpine	20,385	November 17	December 11	Unknown cause; 81 structures destroyed; 1 fatality	
Airport	Riverside	1,087	December 1	December 12	Unknown cause	
Bond	Orange	6,686	December 2	December 10	Started by a house fire; 31 structures destroyed; 21 structures damaged; 2 firefighter injuries	
Sanderson	Riverside	1,933	December 13	December 14	Unknown cause	
Creek 5	San Diego	4,276	December 23	December 31	Unknown cause; over 7,000 people evacuated from housing areas on Camp Pendleton	

== Gallery of maps ==
Maps of significant wildfires in 2020 in California

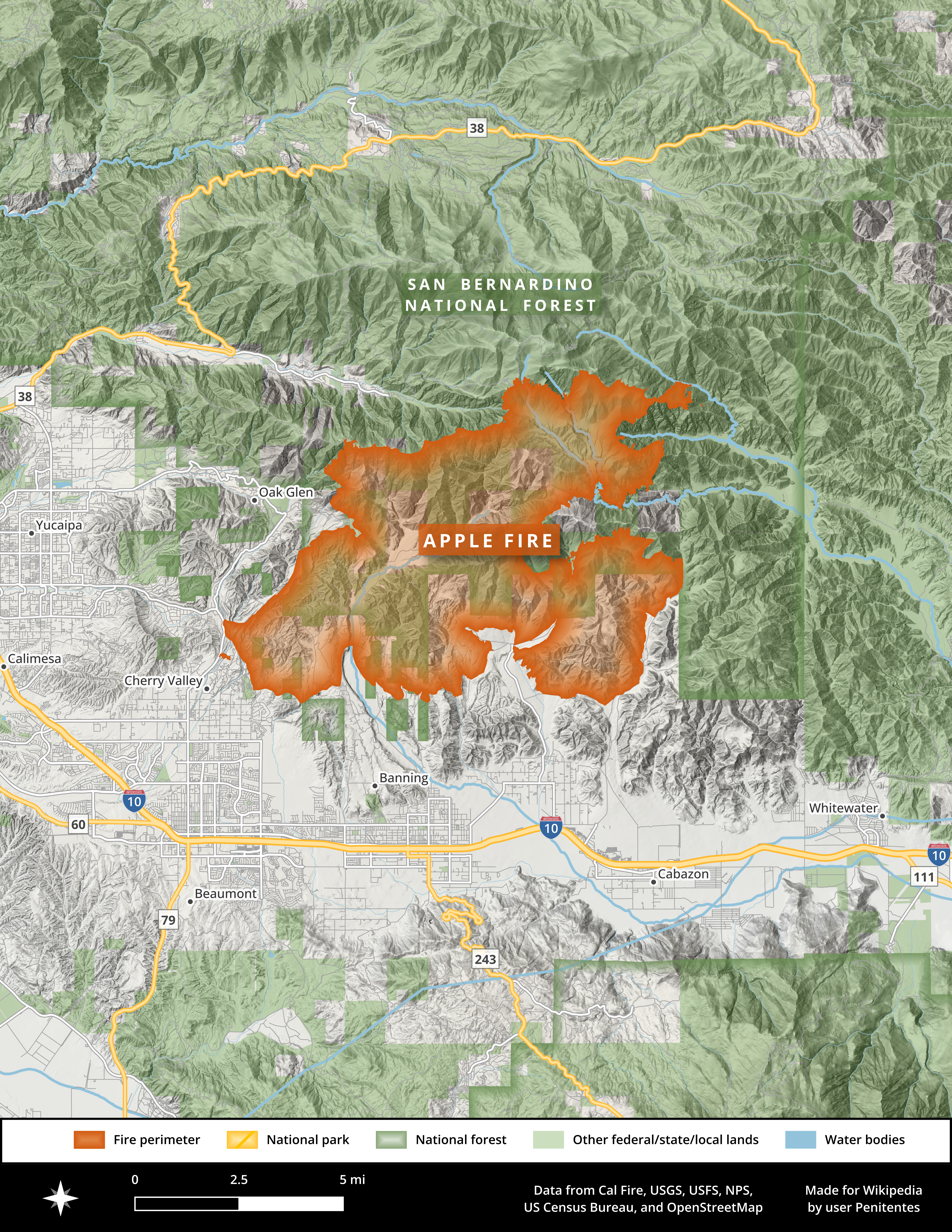
Apple Fire

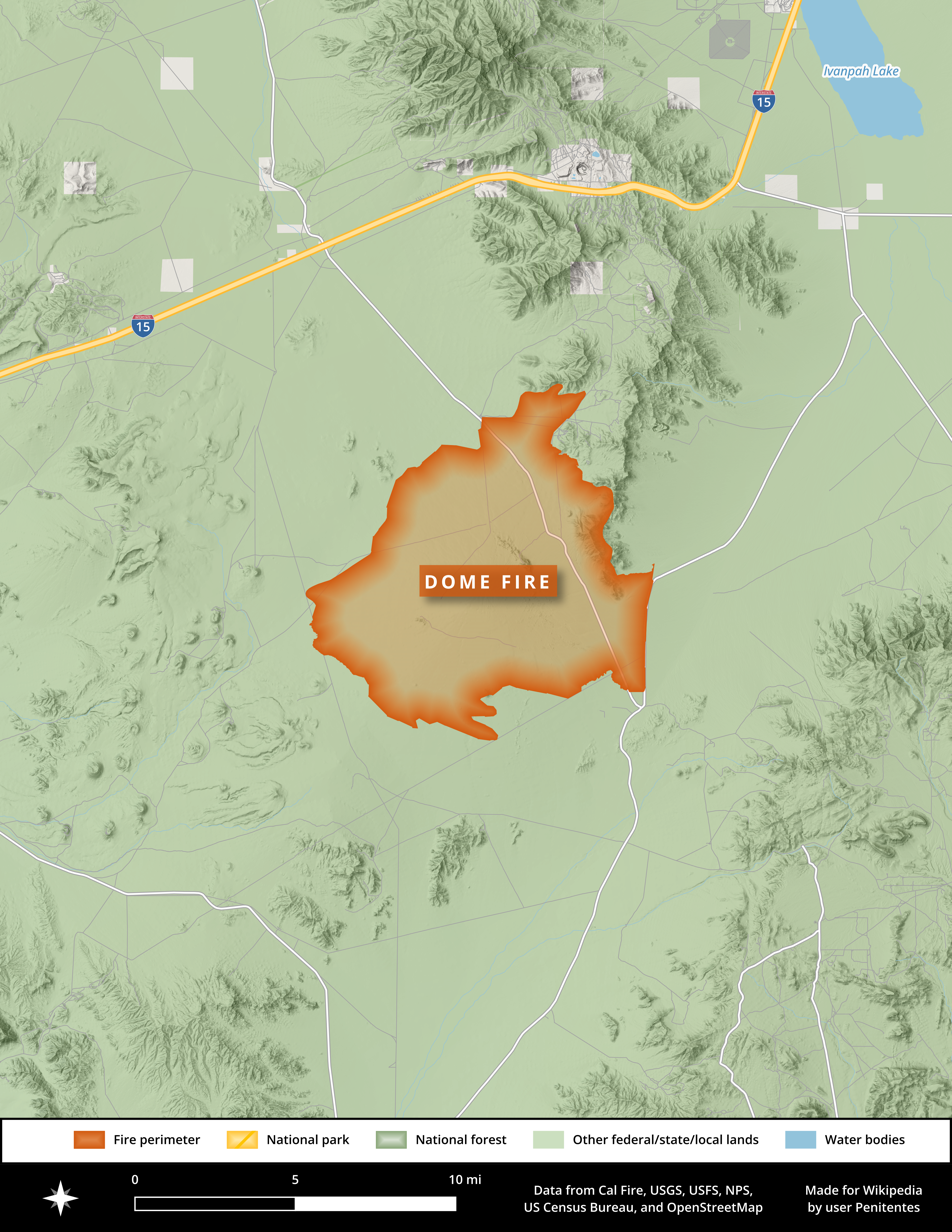
Dome Fire

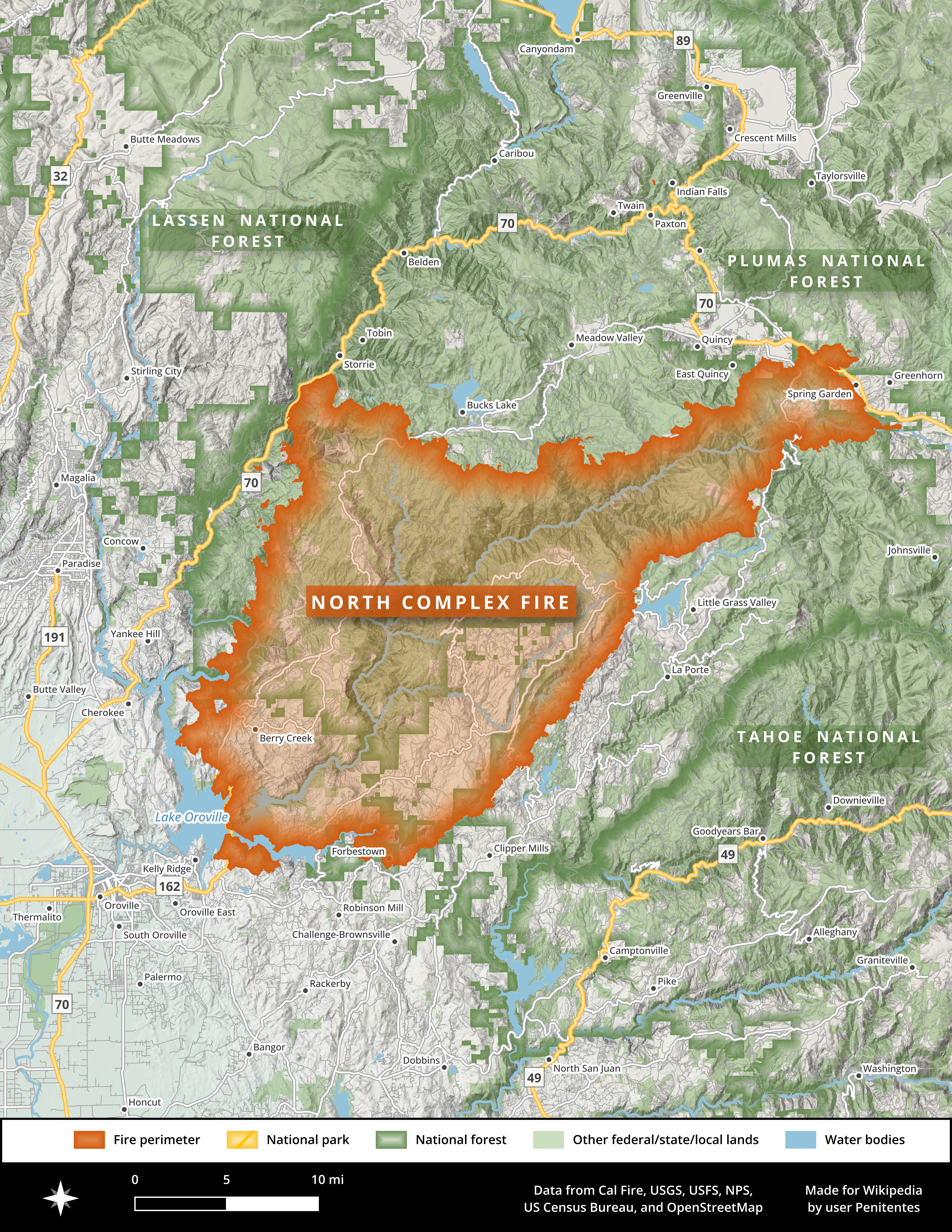
North Complex Fire

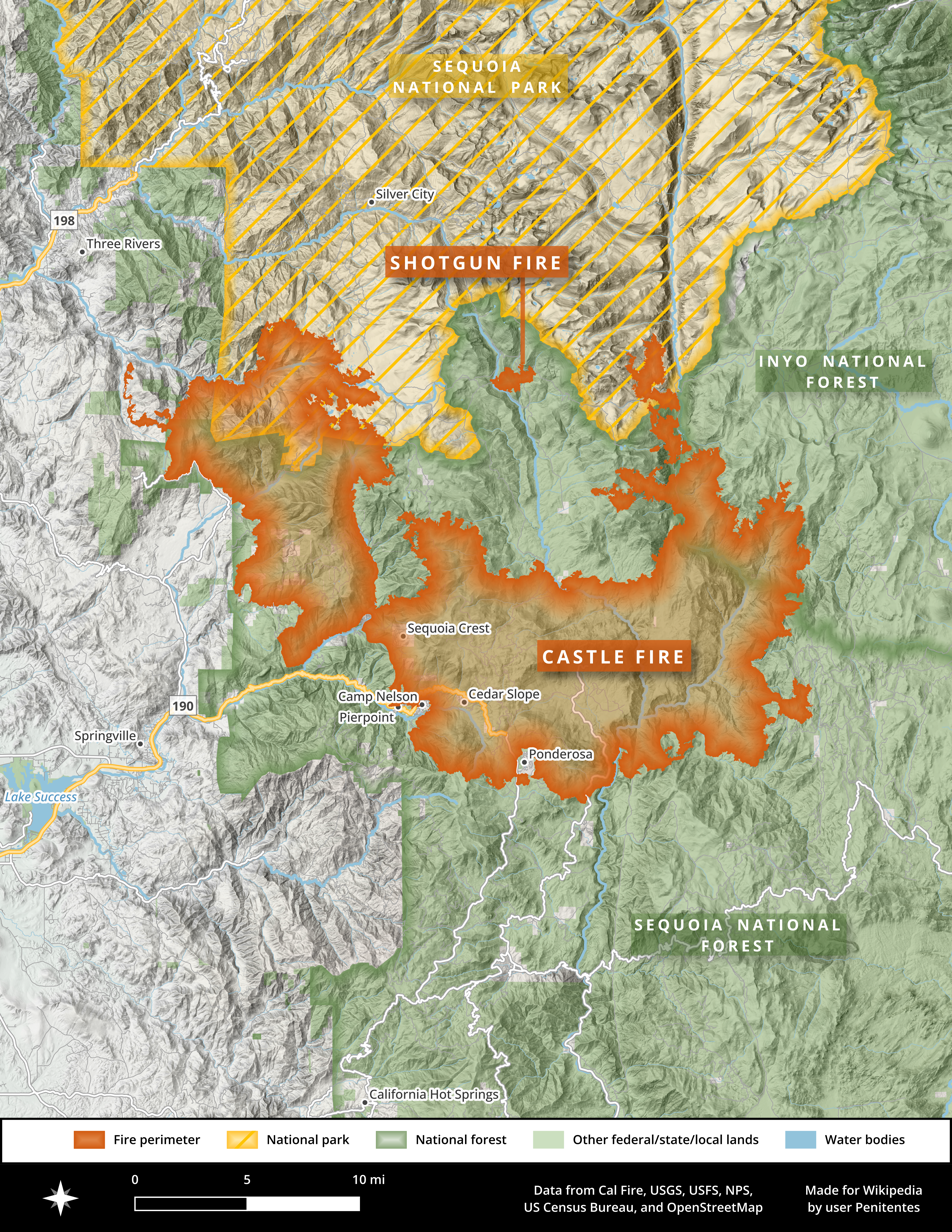
SQF Complex Fire

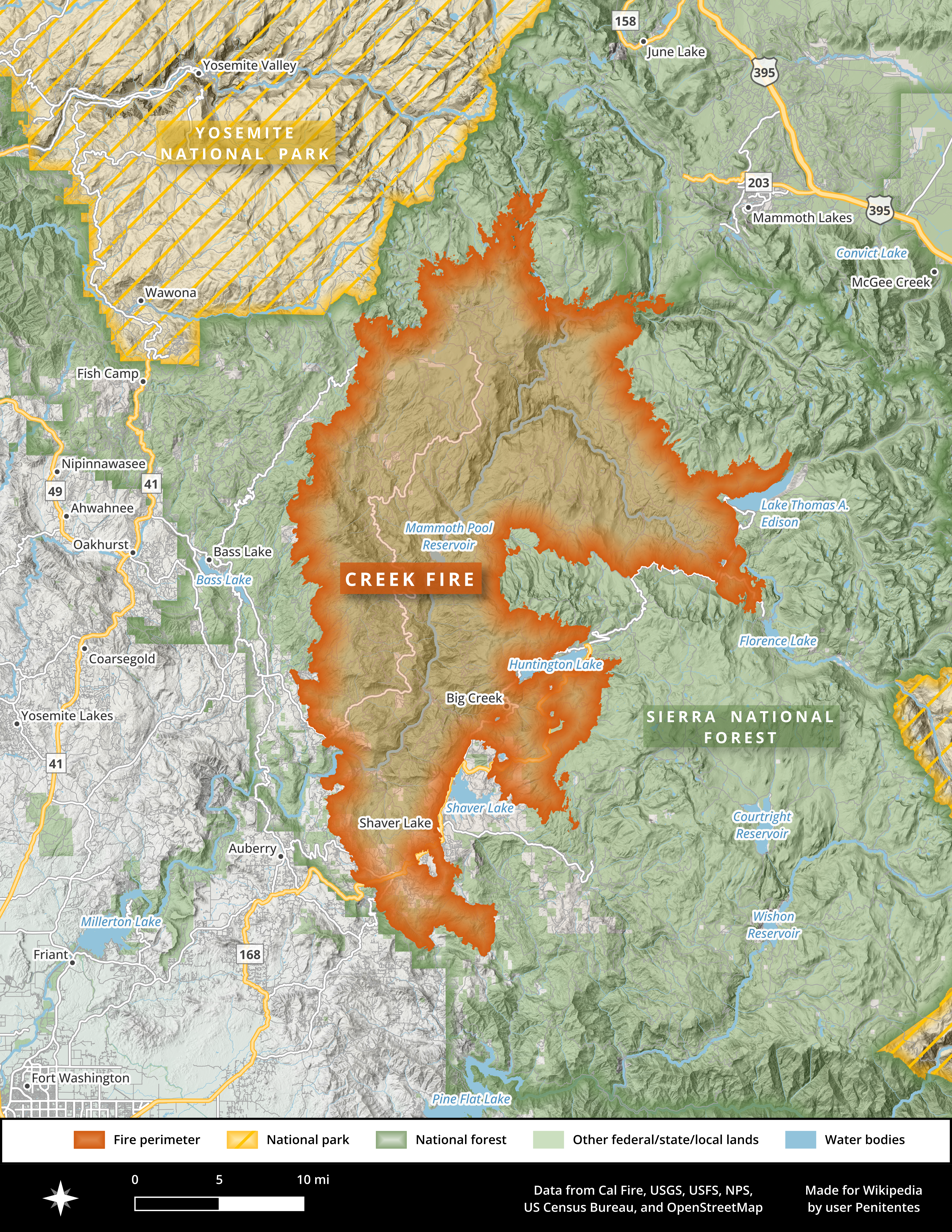
Creek Fire

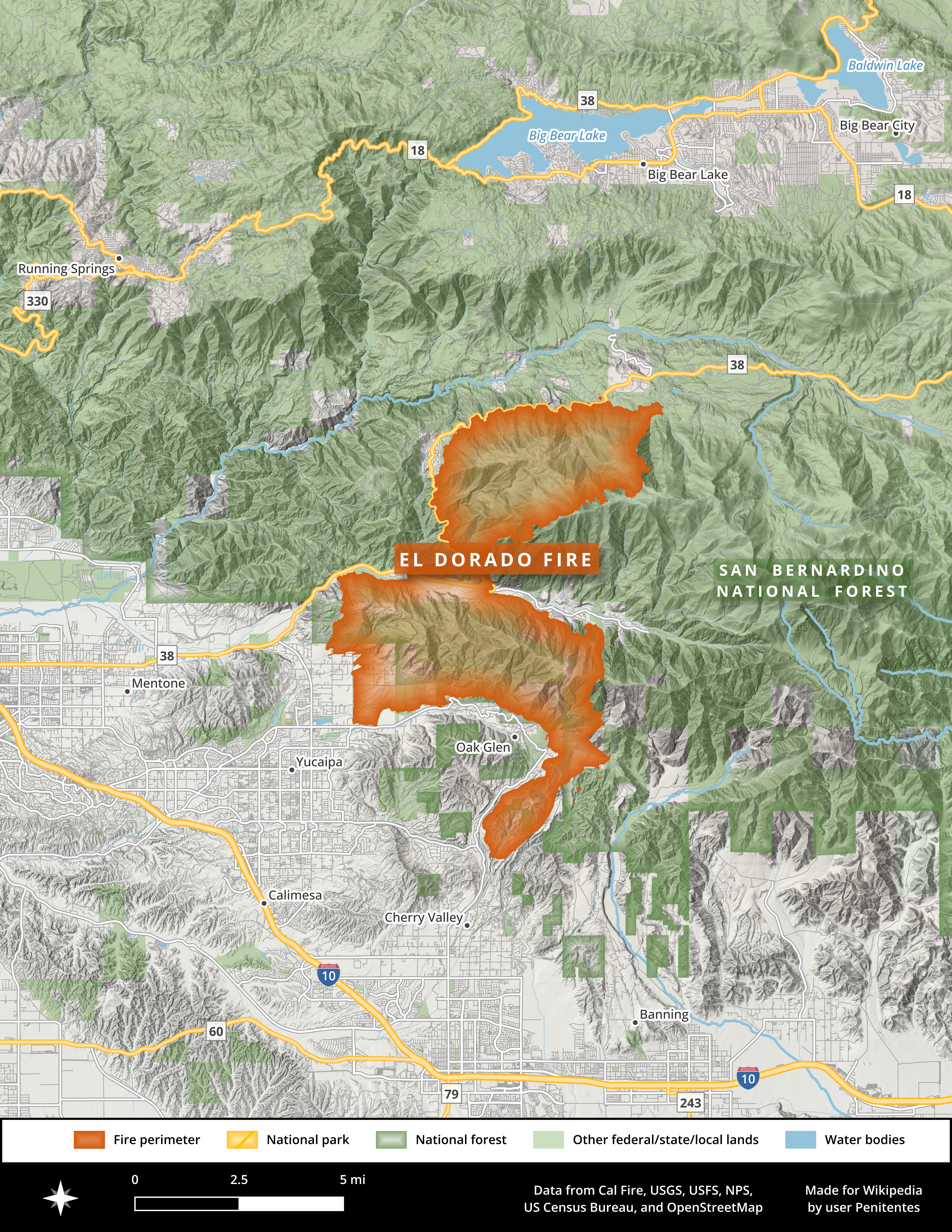
El Dorado Fire

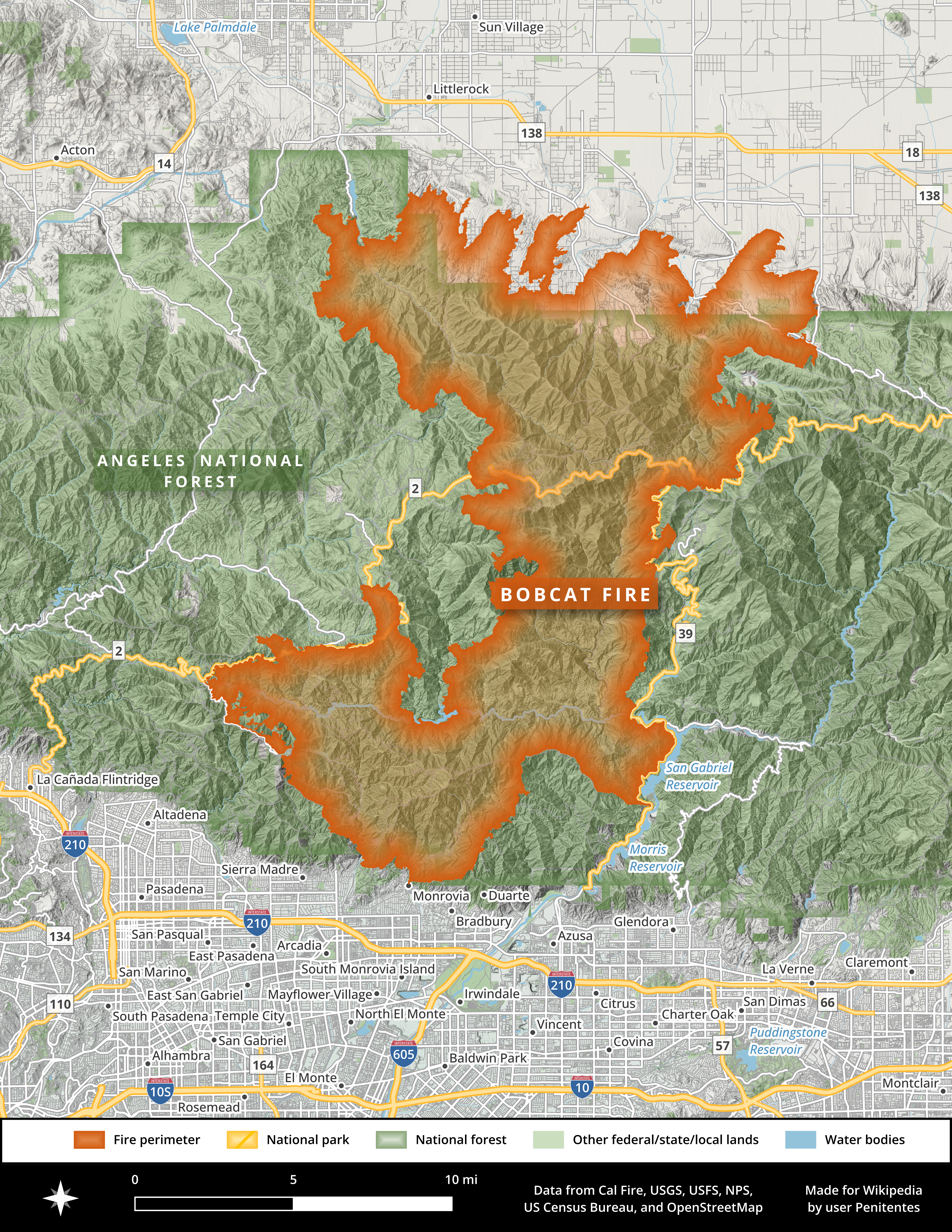
Bobcat Fire

== See also ==
- List of California wildfires
- August 2020 California lightning wildfires
- Emergency evacuation procedures during the COVID-19 pandemic
- Western US wildfire trends
- 2020 Western United States wildfire season
