= Soledad Fire =

2020 wildfire in Southern California

- Part of the 2020 California wildfires
- Date: July 5, 2020 –; July 10, 2020
- Location: Agua Dulce, Los Angeles County, California
- Coordinates: 34.467915°N 118.328877°W

Statistics
- Burned area: 1,525 acres (617 ha)

Impacts
- Injuries: 1

Ignition
- Cause: Unknown

Map
- Location in California

Location of Soledad Fire

The Soledad Fire was a wildfire that burned 1,525 acres (617 ha) south of Agua Dulce and northeast of Santa Clarita in Los Angeles County, California in the United States during the 2020 California wildfire season. The fire started on July 5, 2020, and caused the complete closure of State Route 14 in both directions throughout the day as the fire grew to 1,498 acres. The fire also at a point threatened over 4,795 structures, although only 9 homes were formally threatened by the direct fireline. As of 2025, the cause of the fire remains in question.

== Progression ==
First reported at around 3:30 pm on Sunday, July 5, off of State Route 14 on the south side of the highway, the Soledad Fire was seen only burning a single acre. However within several hours would rapidly expand to over 800 acres due to the hot, dry weather conditions and the topography of the area. State Route 14 was soon closed between Soledad Canyon Road and Escondido Canyon Road throughout the day as the fire at one point crossed the major thoroughfare as it rapidly burned to the northeast. Mandatory evacuation orders were put in place for neighborhoods from Agua Dulce Canyon Road to Briggs and Soledad Canyon to the 14 Freeway that remained in place throughout the day. By evening time, the fire was reported to be over 1,100 acres and 0% contained.

Crews worked through the night to bring the fire under control. As of Monday morning, there was "little visible fire", although concerns remained around the potential for sudden increases in spread due to winds and the topography of the area. Mandatory evacuations of the affected areas were lifted at 2 pm. Northbound lanes of State Route 14 were now opened, however the southbound lanes still remained closed for firefighting operations to continue. The burn area of the fireline was later revised from 1,100 acres to 1,498 acres (606 ha). Containment of the fire was 30% as of Monday morning, 48% by evening, 68% as of Tuesday morning, and 87% as of Tuesday evening.

Minimal fire activity was seen in the following days as containment of the fireline grew. The fire was contained on July 10.

== Effects ==
At the fire's height, at least 4,795 structures were under threat including 9 homes immediately within the rural area of the fire line. 40 residents were placed under a mandatory evacuation order. Over 500 fire personnel were called to fight the fire, and one firefighter sustained a minor injury.

The fire also produced a substantial smoke column that could be seen throughout the Los Angeles area, causing health officials to advise residents to remain indoors as the heavy smoke prompted an unhealthy air quality warning in the Santa Clarita Valley and San Gabriel Mountains.

== See also ==
- 2020 California wildfires
