= Grant Fire =

2020 wildfire in Northern California

- Part of the 2020 California wildfires
- Date: June 12, 2020 –; June 17, 2020
- Location: Sloughhouse, Sacramento County, California
- Coordinates: 38.470809°N 122.038208°W

Statistics
- Burned area: 5,042 acres (2,040 ha)

Impacts
- Structures lost: 1 structure damaged

Ignition
- Cause: Under investigation

Map
- Location in Northern California

Location of Grant Fire

The Grant Fire was a wildfire that burned east of the city of Sacramento near the rural community of Sloughhouse in Sacramento County, California in the United States. It was reported on the afternoon of Friday, June 12, near Grant Line Road the fire quickly grew to the size of 5,042 acres (2,040 ha) as it burned predominantly in light flashy fuels and grasslands as it was fanned by heavy winds in the area. There were no reports of injuries and only one structure was damaged in the fire. However, during the fires peak there were mandatory evacuations ordered near and around Glory Lane and Prairie City OHV Park.

== Progression ==
Reportedly sparking along Grant Line Road and Kiefer Blvd at around 1:00 pm on Friday, June 12, the fire was immediately described as burning at a rapid rate of spread, with already 150 acres in size as it burned in grasses and other light vegetation, as its growth was fanned by heavy wind. Within several hours the fire would jump firebreaks and expand to 700 acres to then 2,000 acres as multiple agencies from in and around Sacramento County aided in containment. The fireline had also damaged one structure. By 6:00 pm that evening, the fire had ballooned to 5,042 acres (20 km^{2}), but fire activity had largely subsided due to the burn area being predominantly light flashy fuels, as the fire was 30% contained. Although the fire continued to remain inactive and the acreage would not grow any further, full containment would not be reached until June 17, 2020.

== See also ==
- 2020 California wildfires
