= Crews Fire =

2020 wildfire in Northern California

- Part of the 2020 California wildfires
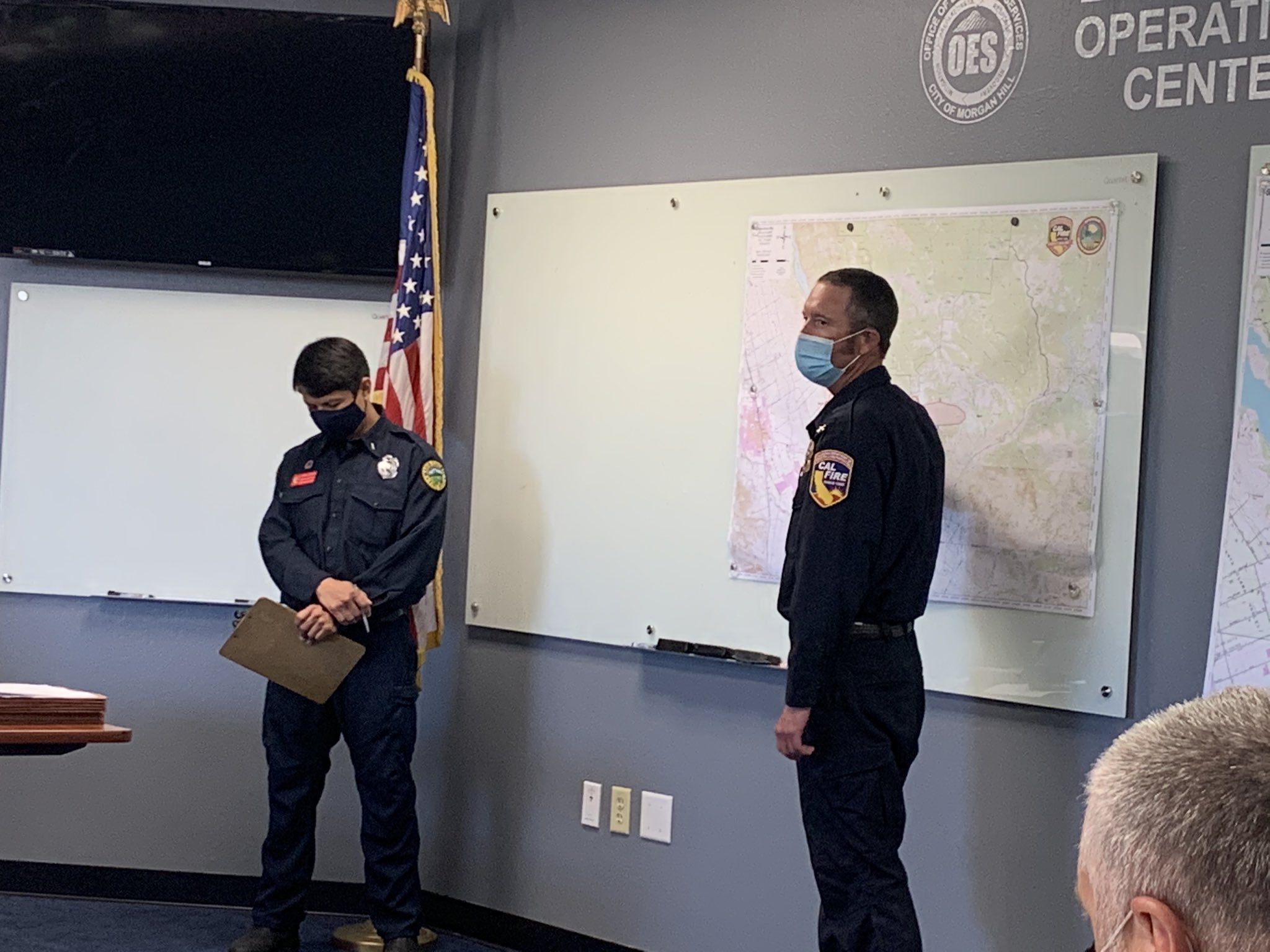
- CAL FIRE officials presenting an update about the Crews Fire on July 6, 2020.
- Date: July 5, 2020 –; July 13, 2020
- Location: Gilroy, Santa Clara County, California
- Coordinates: 37.034839°N 121.501532°W

Statistics
- Burned area: 5,513 acres (2,231 ha)

Impacts
- Injuries: 1 firefighter
- Structures lost: 1 structure destroyed

Ignition
- Cause: Under investigation

Map
- Location in Northern California

Location of Crews Fire

The Crews Fire was a wildfire that burned east of the city of Gilroy in Santa Clara County, California, in the United States. The fire started on July 5, 2020. It burned 5,513 acres (2,231 ha) and was extinguished on July 13, 2020. Burning approximately three miles east of Highway 101, the fire caused the evacuation approximately 20 homes and 70 residents. One structure was destroyed, one was damaged, and one firefighter was injured. It threatened 30 structures and farm and ranch lands in southeast Gilroy in the San Juan Valley. Mandatory evacuations were ordered on July 5, and they were lifted on July 8.

== Progression ==
The Crews Fire was first reported around 2:45 pm on July 5, 2020, burning at Crews Road and Oak Spring Circle, approximately three miles east of Highway 101, in the hills east of the city of Gilroy, California. By the evening, the fire had burned 1,000 acres (405 ha), destroyed two structures, and threatened other structures. The fire crossed Cañada Road, resulting in mandatory evacuations were put in place for residents in the area. However, it started at 1:52 p.m, according to CAL FIRE SCU (Santa Clara Unit).

By the morning of July 6, CAL FIRE reported that the fire had burned 2,000 acres (809 ha) and was 20 percent contained. Additionally, one structure was destroyed, one was damaged, and one firefighter sustained minor injuries. By the afternoon, the fire began moving southeast, threatening farmland. Approximately 70 residents were evacuated and ranchers began evacuating animals. The American Red Cross opened up the Gilroy Senior Center as an evacuation center. Christmas Hill Park was closed to be used a staging area for fire crews. That night, residences and businesses along Highway 152 from Bloomfield to San Felipe Road. The San Joaquin Valley Air Pollution Control District issued an air quality warning for San Joaquin Valley.

Crews slowed the fires crawl towards Highway 152 and Henry Coe State Park on July 7. However, the fire remained challenging to access due to complex fire lines and rugged terrain, requiring the use of aircraft to control the fire. By July 8, all mandatory evacuations were lifted and the evacuation center was closed. The Crews Fire had burned 5,400 acres (2,185 ha) and was 70 percent contained. The cause of the fire remains under investigation.

By July 9, the fire had burned 5,400 acres (2,185 ha), and was 85% contained. Firefighters worked on mopping up and also improving fire lines.

By July 10, the fire had grown up 153 acres (about 62 ha) but firefighters made progress and the Crews Fire was 90% contained. CAL FIRE reported that minimal fire activity was expected, while crews worked on fire line improvement and also mopping up. Later in the day, containment rose to 93%. Firefighters patrolled the perimeter throughout the night.

By July 11, containment was reported at 96%. Firefighters continued to work on the fire line improvement and mopping up, while incident command was transferred from IMT (Incident Management Team) 6 back to SCU. Later in the day, SCU reported that no progress was made on containment.

By July 12, containment rose to 97%.

On July 13, CAL FIRE declared the Crews Fire fully extinguished. The burn area of the fire was updated to 5,513 acres (2,231 ha) due to better mapping of the fire perimeter. Firefighters were set to remain in the area to make sure the fire was fully extinguished for the next week.

== Effects ==
The Crews Fire destroyed one structure, damaged a second, and one firefighter sustained minor injuries.

The City of Gilroy closed Christmas Hill Park, which served as a staging area for fire crews.

Additionally, the fire impacted air quality in the San Joaquin Valley. This resulted in the local air quality agency putting a warning in place, asking residents to stay inside indefinitely until the fire is extinguished. Air quality was impacted in Madera, Kern, San Joaquin, Stanislaus, and Tulare counties.

=== Road closures and evacuations ===
The following was closed by of the morning of July 8: Road closures were subsequently lifted by the afternoon of July 8.

- Cañada Road was closed from Highway 152 to Gilroy Hot Springs

Within hours of the fire being reported, residents on Canada Road were evacuated. Approximately 20 homes and 70 residents were evacuated. Farm and ranch land was also threatened, with ranchers opening their fences to allow animals to quickly escape the flames. The organization Cowboy 911 provided support, recruiting volunteers with horse trailers to help evacuate animals.

== See also ==
- 2020 California wildfires
