= Apple Fire =

2020 wildfire in Southern California

- Part of the 2020 California wildfires
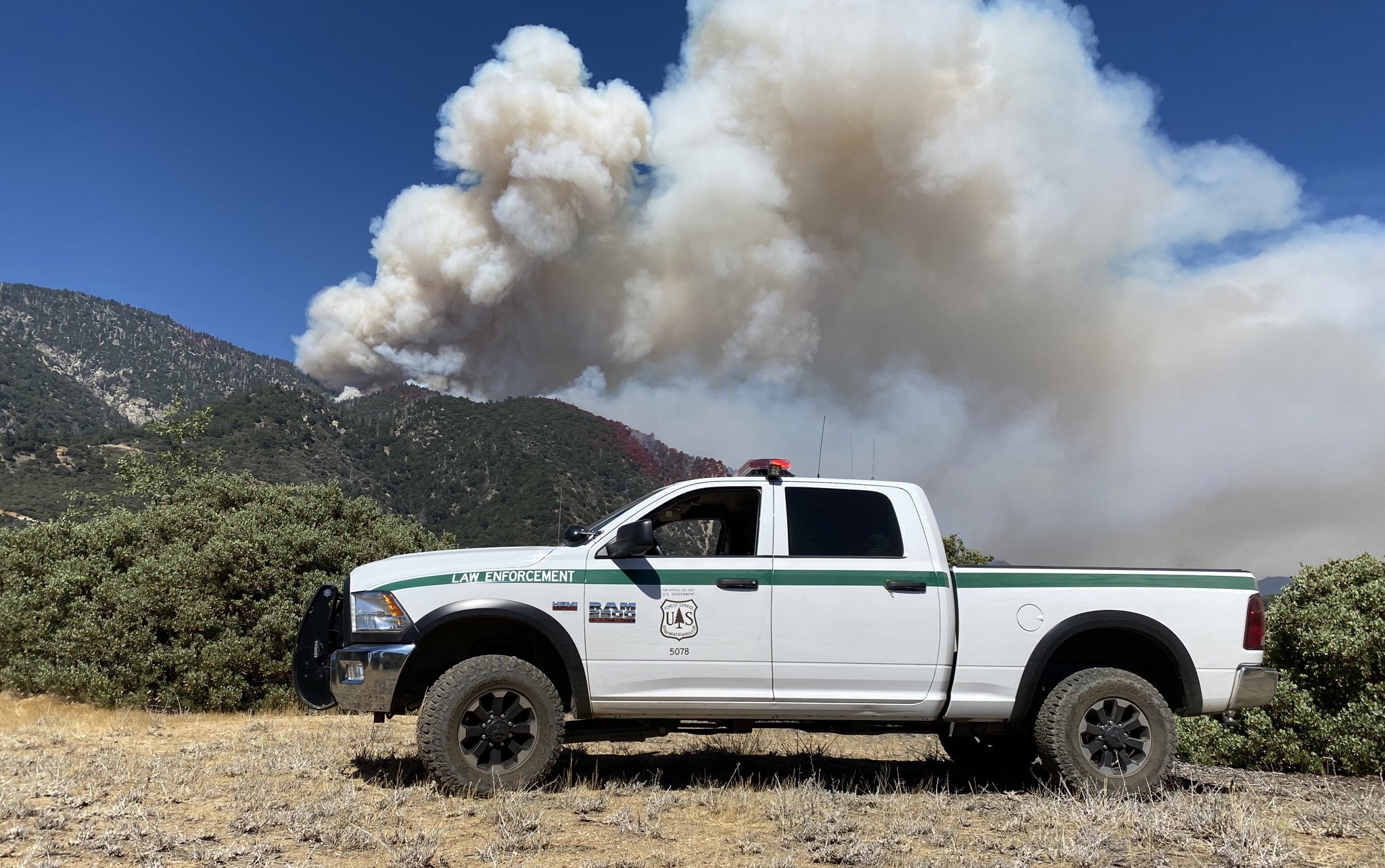
- The Apple Fire burning in the San Bernardino National Forest on August 3, 2020
- Date: July 31 –; November 18, 2020; (111 days)
- Location: Riverside County, Southern California, United States
- Coordinates: 33.990352°N 116.963678°W

Statistics
- Burned area: 33,424 acres (13,526 ha)

Impacts
- Injuries: 1
- Structures destroyed: 12 structures, 2 outbuildings destroyed

Ignition
- Cause: Burning carbon emitted from the tailpipe of vehicle

Map
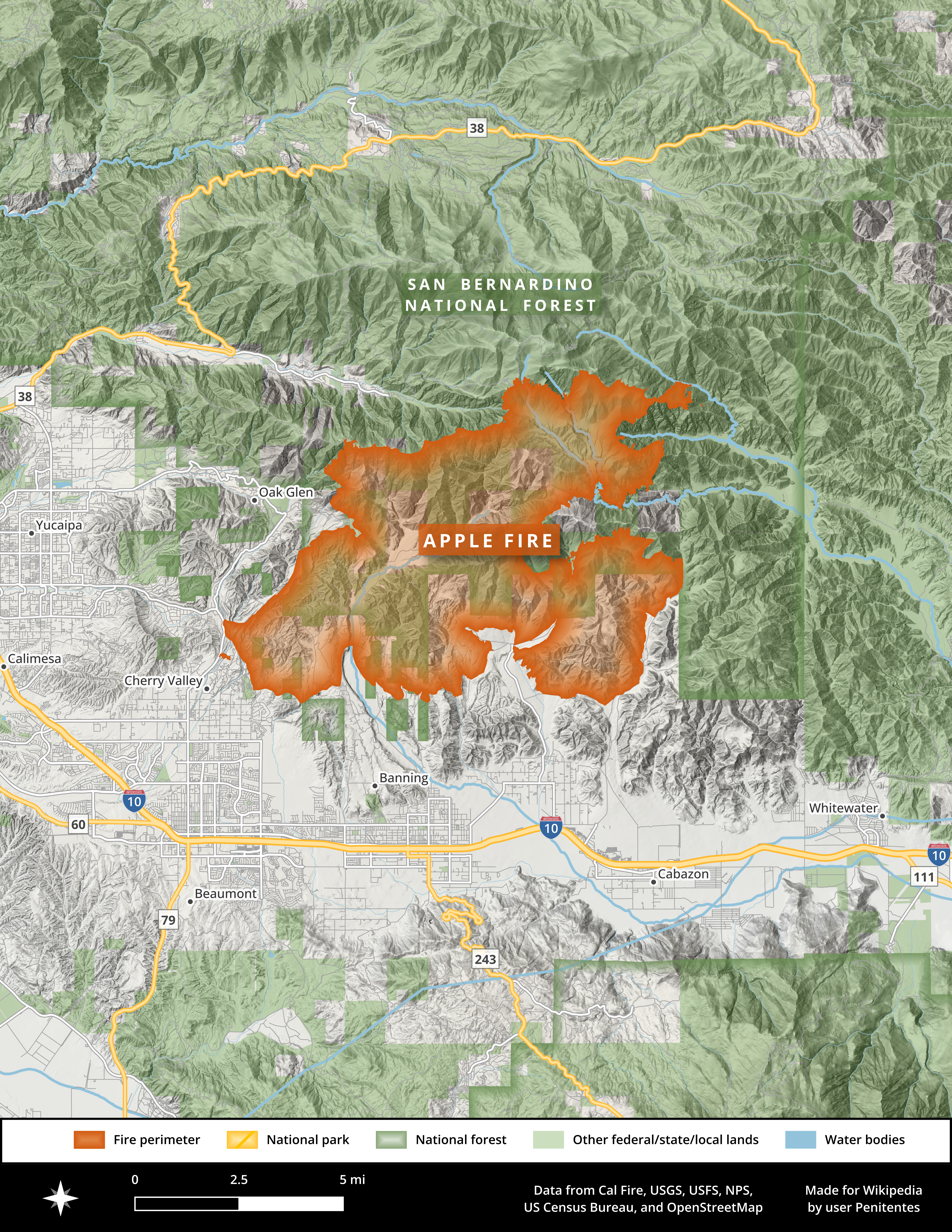
- The footprint of the Apple Fire

- Location in Southern California

Location of Apple Fire

The Apple Fire was a wildfire that burned during the 2020 California wildfire season in Cherry Valley south of Oak Glen and north of Beaumont and Banning in Riverside County, California in the United States. The fire ignited on Friday, July 31, 2020 as three separate smaller blazes within the rural canyons along Oak Glen Road before merging and rapidly expanded to 1,900 acres (769 ha) and destroyed at least one home and two outbuildings in the Cherry Valley area. It now covers at least 33,424 acres (13,526 ha) and created "a plume of smoke so massive that it generated its own winds." The fire was sparked by a diesel-burning vehicle that emitted burning carbon. The fire was named after one of the roadways close to the ignition site, which is named Apple Tree Lane.

== Progression ==
Reportedly starting at 4:55 pm PST on Friday, July 31, as what was initially presumed to be two potential arson ignitions that later merged into one another, the fires started along the 9000 block of Oak Glen Road and Apple Tree Lane in the unincorporated community of Cherry Valley bordering Beaumont. The two separate fires merged just under an hour later at 5:45 pm. A third initially presumed arson fire had also been reported due south of the first two, which went on to burn between 60 and 80 acres as well as several unidentified buildings.

The main fire proceeded to rapidly expand to 350 acres within its first two hours prompting the Riverside County Sheriff's Department to issue mandatory evacuations for well over 200 residences in the Cherry Valley area. No containment was reported throughout the day while the fire grew considerably as it burned predominantly in a north, east and southward direction towards the Banning bluff area. The wind, high temperatures, and inaccessible topography of the area allowed for the fire to burn aggressively as firefighting agencies from Riverside County its surrounding counties were requested to aid in containing the fire. By 9 pm, evacuations were extended to residents living north of Gilman Street in the Banning bluff area as the fire was by this time reportedly now 1,900 acres (769 ha) in size and remained zero percent contained.

In the early morning hours of Saturday, August 1, after a brief lull in fire activity due to low overnight temperatures, the Apple Fire began to further display aggressive and rapid activity due to the rising temperatures, low humidity and strong winds as well as rugged inaccessible terrain that the fire proceeded to advance towards. This caused the fire to explode into the Banning Bluff area which spurred additional mandatory evacuations as it rapidly burned further into the San Bernardino National Forest and up along the south facing side of the San Gorgonio Mountain Range. By 12 pm, the fire had been reportedly sized up at 4,100 acres with still zero percent containment. Additionally, up to 7,800 people had been ordered to evacuate. Within less than 24 hours, the fire had rapidly expanded by 13,000 acres to encompass upwards of 15,000 acres (6,070 ha) by near midnight as the fireline still remained zero percent contained. By Sunday night, on August 2, it surpassed 20,500 acres (8,296 ha) while firefighters finally reached 5% containment. The San Gorgonio Wilderness was also closed off by an Emergency Forest Closure Order, prohibiting entrance to any part of the wilderness.

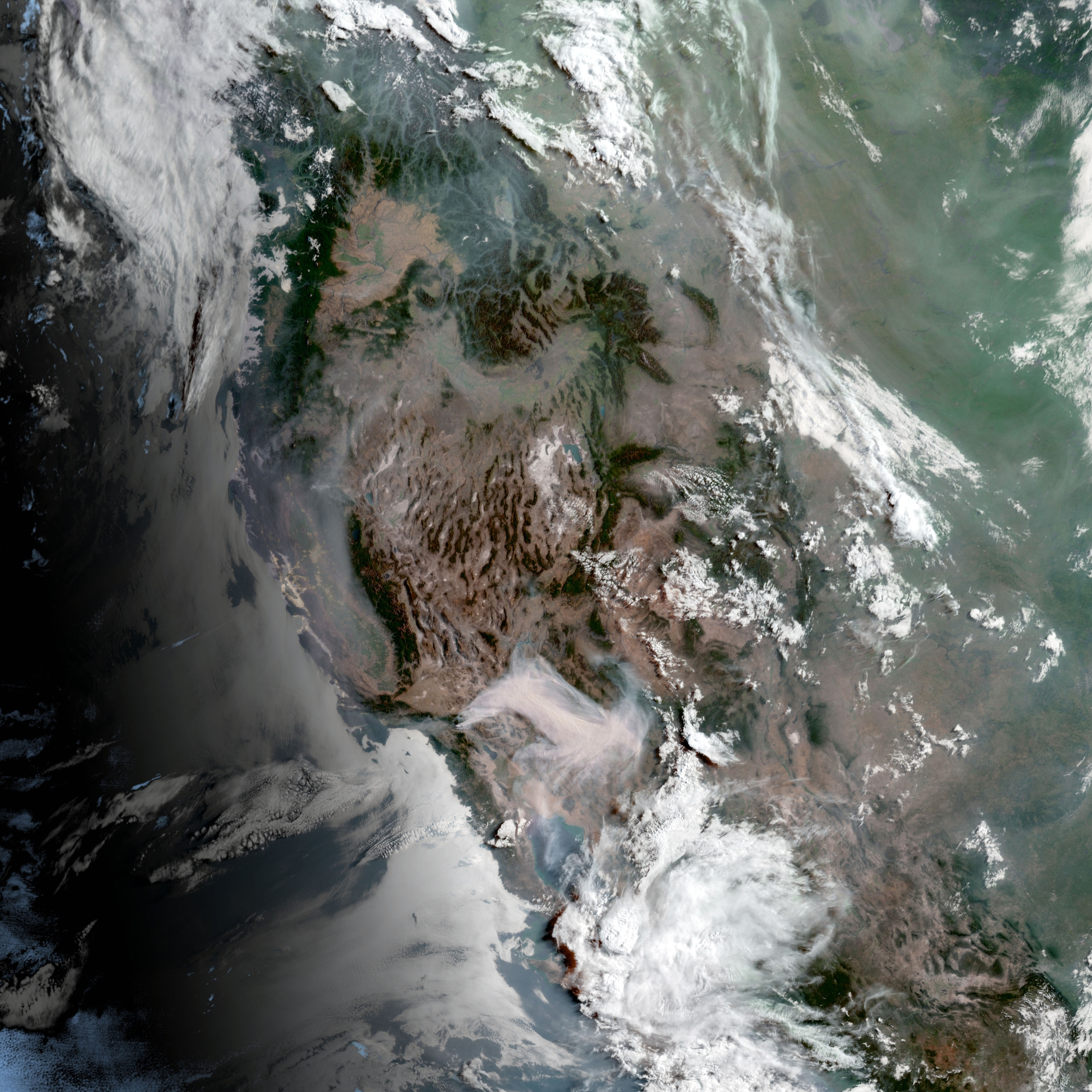
Smoke from the Apple Fire blows over a significant portion of Arizona on August 2, 2020.

By Monday, August 3, the fire had grown to be 26,450 acres (10,704 ha). Containment did not increase. New evacuation orders were issued for residents living in the area north of Morongo Rd, east of Miller Canyon Road, and west of Whitewater Canyon Rd. Orders were also given to people living in the Potato Canyon west, to Raymond Flat in the Oak Glen area. The fire mostly burned north and east towards the San Gorgonio Wilderness. Many of those areas had no recent fire history, and this was further assisted by vegetation with record low moisture contents. Weather-wise, high temperatures, very strong gusts, and low relative humidity all contributed to hampering firefighting efforts. Late into the night, the fire grew to be 26,850 acres (10,866 ha). Firefighters were also able to get up to 7% containment.

By Tuesday, August 4, the fire had not grown any further. Containment was up to 15%. Officials attribute this slowdown due to the Apple Fire burning in areas with sparse vegetation. An evacuation order was issued for the San Bernardino community of Oak Glen, while Forest Falls, Pioneer Town, and Rim Rock given evacuation warnings. 11 more structures were also destroyed, bringing the damage to 12 structures and 2 outbuildings by Tuesday. Weather -wise, officials predicted that the conditions would be warm and dry for most of the day, before cooling down a little and relative humidity increasing in the afternoon. Humidity was expected to drop later that night. Later that night, containment was increased to 20%, with still no fire spread.

By Wednesday, August 5, the fire had grown to 27,319 acres (11,056 ha). Containment also increased to 30%. Authorities lifted all evacuation orders for Riverside County, but not for San Bernardino County. Road closures for Riverside County were also lifted, but were not lifted for San Bernardino County. The Beaumont High School was also closed, as there was no more need for an evacuation center in Riverside County. Weather-wise, a morning marine layer kept temperatures cooler for firefighters, but afternoon winds were predicted to pick up speed. Later that night, the fire grew to 27,569 acres (11,157 ha). Containment stayed at 30%.

By Thursday, August 6, the fire had grown to 28,085 acres (11,366 ha). Containment was still at 30%. The fire was still moving towards the San Gorgonio Wilderness, and burning through vegetation with no recent fire history. However, going deeper, the fire was predicted to burn into areas with dead vegetation, and also timber that had been killed by bark beetles. Weather-wise, the conditions were expected to be favorable for firefighters. This included a continuation of the cooling trend that had begun yesterday. However, winds were expected to pick up speed in the afternoon. Regarding evacuations, most everything stayed the same, except for new evacuation warnings for the area east of Potrero Rd, north of Morongo Rd, and west of Whitewater Canyon Rd.

== Effects ==
The first day of the fire, Friday, July 31 saw significant mandatory evacuations for numerous communities surrounding the initial fire area as the blaze rapidly grew. During the fire's first two hours of burning the areas of At 7 pm, Friday, July 31, mandatory evacuations were ordered for residents in Cherry Valley north of Dutton Street, east of Oak Glen Road and south of County Line Road. By 9 pm, evacuations were extended to residents living north of Gilman Street in the Banning bluff area. And by 11 pm, evacuation orders were again extended north of Cherry Valley Boulevard, west of Highland Springs Avenue and east of Beaumont Avenue. An evacuation center was set up at Beaumont High School at 39139 Cherry Valley Boulevard in Beaumont. Additional mandatory evacuations were ordered for residences living along the Banning Bench and road closures were put in place along North Sunset Avenue at Wilson Street and North San Gorgonio Avenue at Summit Drive as the fire advanced towards the community. Smoke also made its way from the fire to areas as far as Arizona and San Diego. An evacuation order was also given for Oak Glen in San Bernardino County, while Forest Falls, Pioneer Town, and Rim Rock were issued evacuation warnings. However, all road closures and evacuations for Riverside County were lifted on August 5. However, the communities in San Bernardino County did not have their evacuation warnings and orders lifted.

== Cause ==
On Monday, August 3, several days after the three spot fires that later merged into the Apple Fire had broken out, arson investigators had determined that the cause of the fires was the result of "hot objects" emanating from a vehicle tailpipe. CALFIRE officials stated that a diesel-fueled vehicle had emitted burning carbon from the exhaust system and into nearby brush and chaparral, according to multiple independent eyewitnesses as well as supporting physical evidence. In the early hours of the fire, a rumor had begun circulating that the fires were deliberately set along Oak Glen Road and Apple Tree Lane, which some conflicting reports of a person fleeing the area at the time of the ignitions. However, CAL FIRE investigators were certain due to the supporting evidence that it was in fact a vehicle malfunction shooting out black soot that started the three fires.

== See also ==
- 2020 California wildfires
