= Slater and Devil fires =

2020 wildfires in California and Oregon

Slater and Devil Fires
- Part of the 2020 California wildfires and 2020 Oregon wildfires
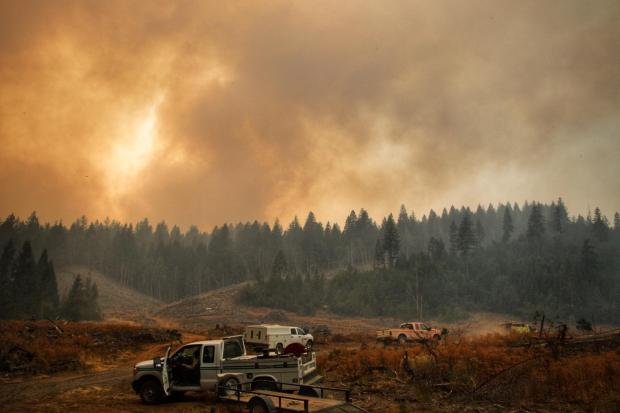
- The Slater Fire near the Rogue River on Sept 15, 2020
- Date: September 7, 2020 –; November 16, 2020
- Location: Siskiyou and Del Norte counties, California, Josephine County, Oregon
- Coordinates: 41.766°N 123.375°W (Slater); 41.915°N 123.268°W (Devil)

Statistics
- Total fires: 2
- Total area: 166,127 acres (67,229 ha) (Both); 157,220 acres (63,625 ha) (Slater); 8,857 acres (3,584 ha) (Devil)

Impacts
- Deaths: 2
- Injuries: 12
- Structures lost: 440 (destroyed); 11 (damaged)
- Cost: $53,679,525 (Both) $53 million (Slater) $679,525 (Devil)

Ignition
- Cause: Under investigation

Map
- Location of Slater and Devil fires

Location of Slater and Devil fires

The Slater and Devil fires were two fires that burned in Northern California and Southern Oregon during the 2020 California wildfire season. The fires burned 166,127 acres (67,229 ha), claimed two lives, injured 12 people, and were 100% contained on November 16. The fires caused some highway reconstructions and forest closures.

== Progression ==
The Slater and Devil fires were first reported on September 8, 2020, west of Happy Camp, California. The Slater fire crossed the Oregon border into Josephine County, Oregon, within hours of initial attack, with little containment. By November 8, the Slater fire was 87% contained and the Devil fire was 67% contained, at 157,220 acres (63,625 ha) and 8,857 acres (3,584 ha) respectively. Both fires were declared contained on November 16, 2020.

== Effects ==
Due to the fires, the Klamath National Forest, Six Rivers National Forest, Rogue River-Siskiyou National Forest, and Oregon Caves National Monument and Preserve were temporarily closed. Two firefighters died as a result of the fires, the town of Gasquet and US Highway 199 were temporarily evacuated, and 12 people suffered injuries from the fire. Reconstruction began on November 24, 2020, on damaged roads, including CA 96, and on destroyed buildings. Damage from the fire has been estimated at nearly $54 million.

== See also ==
- 2020 California wildfires
- 2020 Oregon wildfires
- Klamath Theater Complex Fire
