= Red Salmon Complex fire =

2020 wildfire in Northern California

Red Salmon Complex
- Part of the 2020 California wildfires
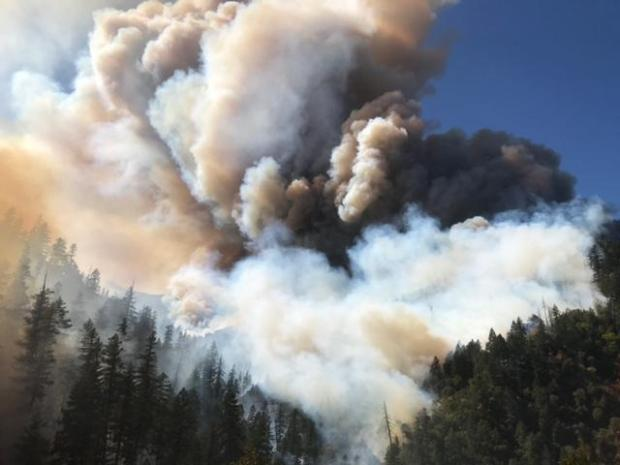
- The complex on Sept 27, 2020
- Date: July 27, 2020 –; November 17, 2020
- Location: Humboldt, Trinity and Siskiyou counties, California
- Coordinates: 41.185°N 123.433°W

Statistics
- Total fires: 2
- Total area: 144,698 acres (58,557 ha)

Ignition
- Cause: Lightning

Map
- Location in California

The Red Salmon Complex was a wildfire that burned 144,698 acres (58,557 ha) in Humboldt, Trinity, and Siskiyou County in Northern California during the 2020 California wildfire season. On July 27, lightning strikes in the Trinity Alps Wilderness started two fires, the Salmon Fire and the Red Fire, which eventually merged. As the fire grew, hazardous smoke levels surrounded Forks of Salmon, Orleans, Yreka, and Weed.

== Progression ==
The fire was first reported on July 27, 2020. It was caused due to lightning strikes in July and August 2020 in California. The fire's containment process was slow, only reaching 5% containment within 10 days, and wasn't contained until November 17. Cooler weather stopped the growth of the fire, which led to its containment in November.

== Effects ==
The fires have devastated the air quality in Siskiyou County, and can be hazardous to some people, and Forks of Salmon was evacuated. Forests like Six Rivers, Shasta-Trinity and Klamath national forests also had a lot of land burnt down by the complex, and therefore, temporarily closed.

== See also ==
- 2020 California wildfires
- August Complex fire
