= Quail Fire (2020) =

2020 wildfire in Northern California

- Part of the 2020 California wildfires
- Date: June 6, 2020 –; June 10, 2020
- Location: Winters, Solano County, California
- Coordinates: 38.470809°N 122.038208°W

Statistics
- Burned area: 1,837 acres (743 ha)

Impacts
- Structures lost: 3 structures destroyed

Ignition
- Cause: Under investigation

Map
- Location in Northern California

Location of Quail Fire

The Quail Fire was a wildfire that burned during the 2020 California wildfire season southwest of Winters and north of Vacaville in Solano County, California in the United States. Igniting on Saturday, June 6, within the rural confines of Quail Canyon, the fire ballooned to an estimated 1,837 acres (743 ha) and destroyed three structures including one residential property. The fire was fully contained on Wednesday, June 10, 2020, and the cause remains under investigation.

== Progression ==
The fire was first reported on the afternoon of Saturday, June 6, at around 3:30 pm, burning off of Quail Canyon and Pleasant Valley Road just outside the community of Winters. Predominantly fanned by dry vegetation and relatively strong onshore winds from the east that prompted several other smaller grassfires to quickly spread in the greater Solano and bay area that day, the fire was met with an aggressive immediate response by fire officials as it quickly jumped from a second-alarm to a four-alarm-plus vegetation fire. Within several hours, the Quail fire expanded from 150 to 500 acres (61 to 202 ha) as mandatory evacuations were put in place for over 100 structures in the Pleasant Valley area as the fire blew eastward through Quail Canyon and into the rural subdivisions on the outskirts of Winters. By 9:00 pm the blaze had swelled to 1,200 acres (490 ha) and was 5% contained as mandatory evacuations remained in place overnight for the areas of Quail Canyon Road between Pleasants Valley Road and Highway 128.

Throughout the night, the Quail fire exhibited active fire behavior as it crept through the canyons northeast towards Putah Creek where it briefly threatened the Putah Creek State Wildlife Area as it continued to burn eastward towards the community of Winters. By that time, over 600 fire personnel from Woodland, Davis, Butte County and San Francisco were actively engaging the fire. Overnight the fire would continue to grow to some 1,400 acres (570 ha) before eventually halting at 1,837 acres (743 ha) by early Sunday, June 7. Later that day, some evacuation orders were lifted for those living in the Quail Canyon area as containment of the fire rose to 40% despite red flag fire conditions that were expected to persist in the area over the coming days. After the next several days, containment was completed on the fire with no additional growth in acreage.

== Effects ==
Evacuations were ordered Saturday, June 6, on Quail Canyon Road between Pleasants Valley Road and Highway 128 and an evacuation center was set up at Three Oaks Community Center in Vacaville for accommodations. The following day, all evacuation orders were lifted.

== See also ==
- 2020 California wildfires
