= Mineral Fire (2020) =

2020 wildfire in Central California

- Part of the 2020 California wildfires
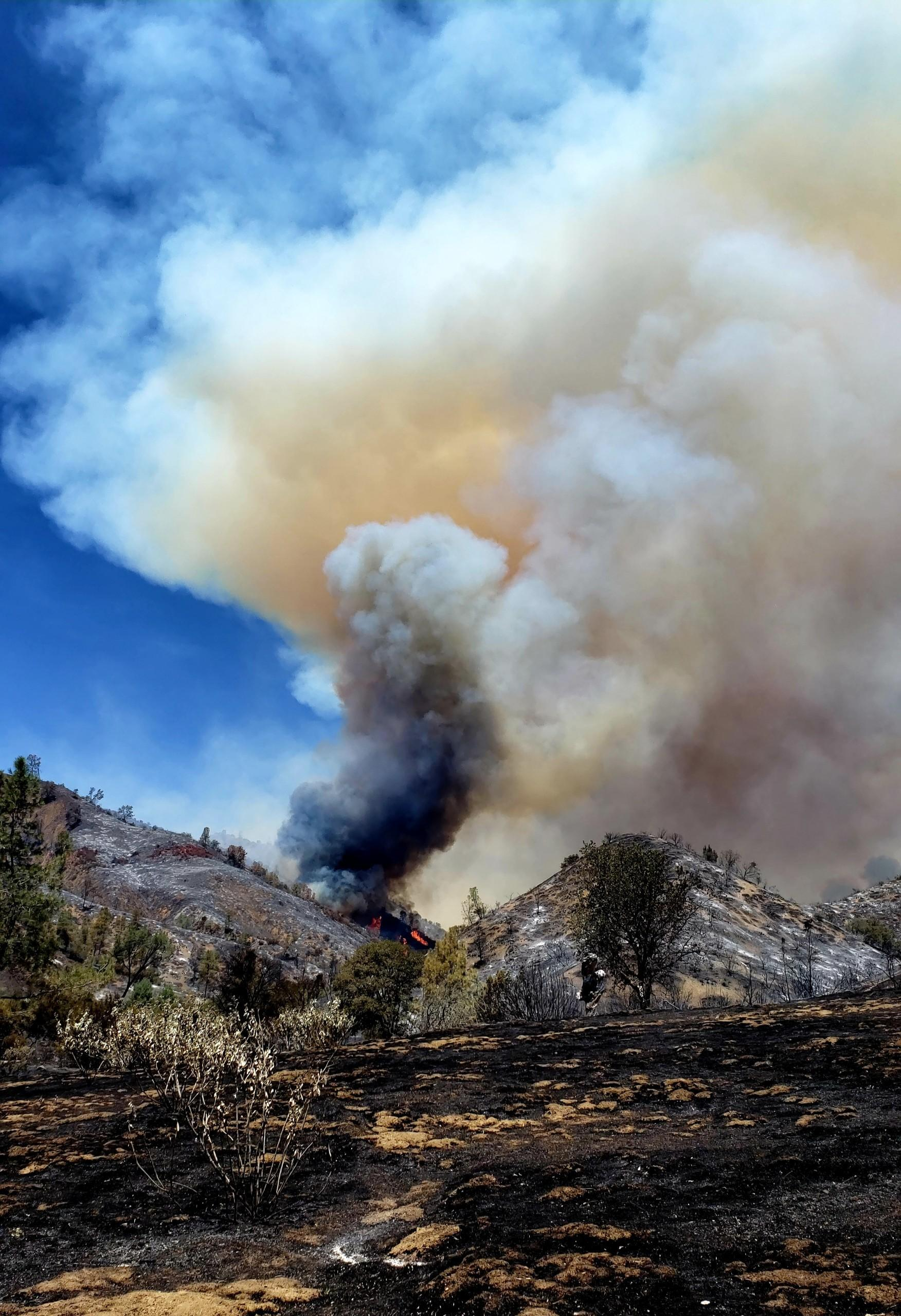
- Date: July 13, 2020 –; July 26, 2020
- Location: Coalinga, Fresno County, California
- Coordinates: 36.09493°N 120.52193°W

Statistics
- Burned area: 29,667 acres (12,006 ha)

Impacts
- Structures lost: 7 structures destroyed

Ignition
- Cause: Under investigation

Map
- Location in California

Location of Mineral Fire

The Mineral Fire was a wildfire that burned in Coalinga Mineral Springs, west of Coalinga in Fresno County, California in the United States. The fire was first reported on July 13, 2020 and burned an estimated 29,667 acres (12,006 ha) and before being fully contained on July 26. The fire threatened the communities of Los Gatos Creek Road from Indian Springs to Union Carbide Road and Bingham Springs. It resulted in the mandatory evacuations of Los Gatos Creek Road and Bingham Springs and led to the complete closure of State Route 198 from Firestone Ave. to the Monterey County Line. They were subsequently lifted on July 20.

== Progression ==
On July 13, the fire was first reported at about 5:00 p.m. near South Coalinga Mineral Springs Rd and Highway 198. It quickly grew to 1,000 acres (404.69 ha) by 9:00 pm, fuelled by nighttime winds and 100-degree weather, according to Deputy Fire Chief Dustin Hail. He also said that firefighters were "...doing significant structural protection..."dozer lines around the homes and engines at the houses doing structure defense."

The following day, July 14, the fire continued to be at 1,000 acres (404.69 ha) and was 0% contained, before growing to 7900 acres (3197.02 ha) by the end of the night, Evacuations were ordered for Los Gatos Creek Road and from Indian Springs to Union Carbide Road. A health warning was also issued by the Valley Air District.

On July 15, the fire had grown to be 11,000 acres (4451.54 ha) and containment had grown to 5% as evacuations remained in progress. The fire was considered difficult to fight due to the remote locations, as well as having no known fire history for many of the fuels in the area. Containment was also impeded by wind-driven runs and rapid uphill movement which lead to rapid growth. In the afternoon, additional evacuations were ordered for all residents from Parsons Road to the Monterey County Line. Evacuations were also issued for everyone from Highway 198 at the Monterey/Fresno line to Coalinga/Los Gatos Creek Road, everyone from Los Gatos Creek Road east to Parson/Mud Run Road, and Parson/Mud Run Road south to Highway 198. Highway 198 from Firestone Avenue to the Monterey County Line remained closed. Later that evening, the fire further grew to become 14,300 acres (about 5787 ha). Containment was also increased to 15%

By July 16, the fire had grown to be 16,500 acres (6677.31 ha). The first structure was also destroyed, and many more are threatened. Officials also suggested that if the fire continued, air quality in Madera, Tulare, and Merced counties may be affected. Officials say the fire is still burning in hard-to-reach areas, and containment is also impeded by uphill and wind-driven runs. However, containment has reached 20%. By nighttime, the fire had grown up to 18,805 acres (about 7610.11 ha). Containment was increased to 25%

By July 17, the Mineral Fire had grown to 19,500 acres (7,891.38 ha). Containment was also increased to 30%. Evacuation orders were extended for residents who live north of Los Gatos Creek, east of Derrick Road, west of South San Joaquin Rocks Lookout Road and south of Spanish Lake along Joaquin Ridge and Wright Mountain. Evacuation orders still remained in place for other areas. Later that night, the fire grew to 23,000 acres (about 9307.76 ha). Containment stayed at 30%.

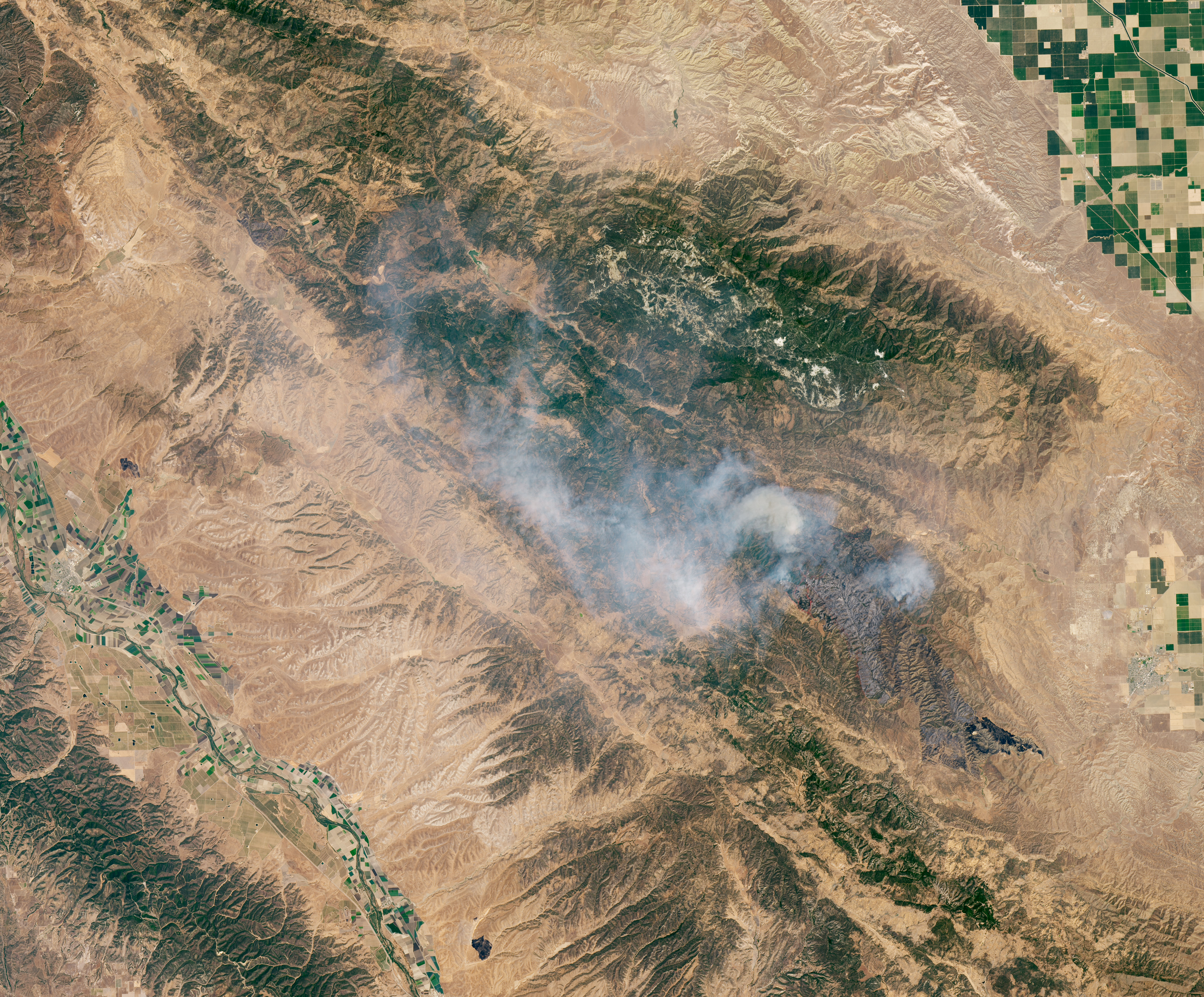
The Mineral Fire from satellite imagery on July 17, 2020.

By July 18, The Mineral Fire had grown to 23,500 acres (9510.11 ha). Containment also increased to 35%. Later that night, the fire grew to 24,600 acres (about 9955.27 ha). Containment did not increase.

By July 19, CAL FIRE reported that the fire had grown to 25,000 acres (about 10117.14 ha). No progress has been made on containment. Later that night the fire grew to 26,721 acres (10,814 ha). Containment increased to 47%.

By July 20, the fire grew to be 28,221 acres (11420.63 ha). Containment also increased to 49%. Firefighters dealt with hot and dry weather, but fire lines were improved and reinforced. Later that noon, all evacuation and road closures were lifted. By the end of July 20, the fire had grown to 28,500 acres (11,534 ha). Containment was increased to 62%. Firefighters shifted their attention to repairing suppression activities.

By July 21, the fire was still at 28,500 acres (11,534 ha). Containment was at 68%. Later that night, fire grew to 29,667 acres (12006 ha). Containment was also increased to 70%. By this time, firefighters began working on mopping up and removing firefighting equipment.

By July 22, the fire was still at 29,667 acres (12006 ha). Containment increased to 75%. Later that night, containment increased to 80%.

From July 23 to July 25, the fire made no progress. This would be the same until full containment (July 26). Firefighters slowly contained the fire, first from 85 - 90% on July 23, then to 95% on July 24, and from 96% to 97% on July 25.

On July 26, CAL FIRE declared the Mineral Fire 100% contained.

== Effects ==
The fire caused the evacuation of many residents. This included everyone from Highway 198 at the Monterey/Fresno line to Coalinga/Los Gatos Creek Rd, everyone from Los Gatos Creek Road east to Parson/Mud Run Road, and Parson/Mud Run Road south to Highway 198 and also everyone from Los Gatos Road to Union Carbide Road. The fire has also led to the closure of Coalinga Mineral Springs County Park, and Coalinga Mineral Springs National Recreation Trail. Smoke was seen in the San Francisco Bay Area, as well as San Luis Obispo County, and potentially Madera, Merced, and Tulare counties. Air advisories have been issued for the Bay Area and the San Joaquin Valley They were later extended further into the week. But by July 20, all evacuations and road closures were lifted. NASA also released images of the fire, as seen from space.

== Growth and containment ==
Fire containment status Gray: contained; Red: active; %: percent contained;
Date	Area burned acres (km^{2})	Containment
Jul 13	1,000 (4)	
Jul 14	7,900 (32)	
Jul 15	14,300 (58)	
Jul 16	18,805 (76)	
Jul 17	23,000 (93)	
Jul 18	24,600 (100)	
Jul 19	26,721 (108)	
Jul 20	28,500 (115)	
Jul 21	29,667 (120)	
July 22–26	---	---
Jul 27	29,667 (120)	

== Related links ==
2020 California wildfires
