= Emergency evacuation procedures during the COVID-19 pandemic =

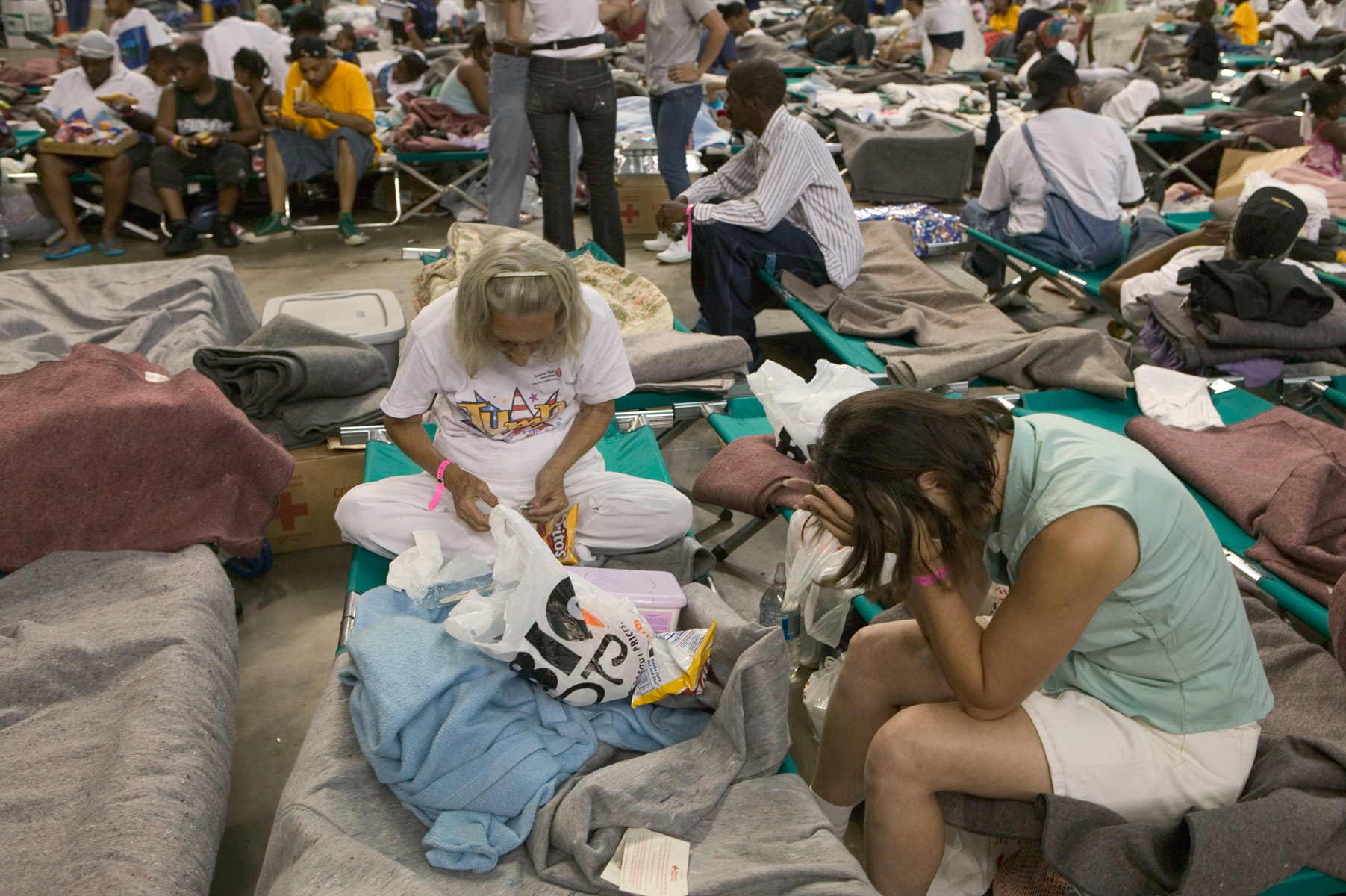
Historic occupancy rates of congregate shelters may not provide appropriate physical distancing.

Signs similar to this one from the Japanese Ministry of Health, Labour and Welfare may remind evacuees to avoid risky behavior if posted at evacuation check-in areas or shared use facilities.

The COVID-19 pandemic coincided with record-breaking wildfires in the western United States and a record number of hurricane landfalls in the southeastern United States. Emergency evacuation may be required for people living in areas threatened by natural disasters. Historic procedures maximizing capacity of public transport and emergency shelters may be inconsistent with quarantine and physical distancing measures related to the COVID-19 pandemic. It is not advisable to set up congregate shelters in an environment heavily impacted by a pandemic. Non-congregate shelters typically provide more effective physical distancing. Examples include buildings with single room occupancy, hotels or dormitories with private sleeping spaces but possibly shared bathroom or cooking facilities. Thousands of evacuees from Hurricane Laura were still in emergency lodgings as Hurricane Delta approached the Louisiana coast. Six-thousand from southwest Louisiana were in twelve New Orleans area hotels. Three-thousand-five-hundred remained in shelters as Hurricane Zeta approached Louisiana. A volcanic eruption on the island of Saint Vincent in April 2021 caused evacuation of sixteen-thousand people. Four-thousand evacuees were placed in eighty-nine government shelters after being tested for COVID-19, with those testing positive taken to isolation centers. Six-thousand evacuees found shelter in private homes.

== Evacuation planning ==
Evacuation plans may be prepared for areas routinely experiencing life-threatening conditions. Texas coastal regions have standing agreements in place with inland communities that take in evacuees and people rescued from hurricanes. Port Arthur and Beaumont evacuate to San Antonio, while Galveston evacuates to Austin. The state provides buses to transport people to the partner cities and towns where they are checked in and taken to government-paid hotel or motel rooms where families can be better isolated than in congregate shelters. The city's costs for the hotels, like emergency shelters, were expected to be reimbursable with disaster funds from the federal government. Texas increased its contracted number of buses, because a bus that might previously have transported fifty people may seat only fifteen or twenty with physical distancing. Masks were required on buses and were provided to those who don't have them. As hotels filled to capacity in the normal evacuation cities, evacuees were urged to stay on the road north toward Dallas. Evacuees were checked for fevers before getting on the bus transporting them.

=== Individual preparation ===
Residents in the projected path of hurricanes were encouraged stockpile food and water for two weeks, and to prepare an emergency evacuation kit including everything needed to survive unassisted for three days with prescription medications for a full month. Evacuees coming to shelters were encouraged to bring extra clothing, pillows, blankets, other comfort items and important documents. Centers for Disease Control and Prevention (CDC) recommended adding the following items to an emergency evacuation supply kit:

- Disinfectant wipes and spray
- Bar or liquid soap
- Hand sanitizer with at least 60% alcohol
- Minimum of two masks per person for each person over the age of 2 in your household

== Evacuation registration points ==
Some large indoor shelters were replaced with evacuation check-in points where evacuees were given hotel room vouchers, while others were assigned dormitory rooms at colleges where classes had been cancelled. One-hundred-thousand evacuees from Orange County's Silverado Fire were placed in hotels and motels instead of large community centers. Evacuees arriving by car lined up in the parking lot and remained in their vehicle during the screening. Those arriving by foot or bicycle, or dropped off by a taxi or ride-share service were to maintain physical distancing and stay 6 feet away from other people. Arriving evacuees were screened for COVID-19 symptoms and exposure by Public Health or other qualified personnel. COVID-19 positive individuals and members of their household were routed or transported to the most appropriate shelter site. Individuals identified as COVID-19 positive or symptomatic, and/or exposed to COVID-19, were not sheltered with the general population.

== Medical needs shelters ==
Locations receiving evacuees may establish a medical shelter for evacuees with COVID-19 symptoms or other health needs. Mississippi opened shelters including the Mississippi State Medical Needs Shelter in Wiggins. Admission to the Mississippi State Medical Needs Shelter is evaluated based on the following criteria:

- Those with health or medical conditions who require professional observation or care,
- Those with chronic conditions who require assistance with daily living activities or skilled nursing care, but do not require hospitalization,
- Those who need supervised medication dispensing or vital signs readings,
- Those with physical, mental, or cognitive disabilities who cannot be sheltered in a general population shelter, or
- Those with other disabilities who cannot be sheltered in a general population shelter.

== Congregate shelters ==
The American Red Cross published Pre-Landfall Shelter Operations in COVID-19 Pandemic guidelines. Red Cross physical distancing guidelines for congregate shelters may reduce historic shelter capacity by 60 percent. Emergency shelter personnel followed CDC official guidance, local health officer orders, and best practices to protect shelter guests and workers and reduce the rate of transmission of COVID-19. Modifications to shelter operations include:

- Temperature checks, ongoing screening, and assessment of shelter guests and workers for COVID-19 symptoms. Shelter workers used personal protective equipment (PPE) when conducting temperature checks and screening.
- Shelter guests were instructed to watch their children for signs of illness and immediately inform shelter staff if they start to feel ill while sheltering or if they observe children who may be ill.
- Shelter guests and workers were instructed to avoid touching high-touch surfaces, such as handrails, as much as possible; and to wash hands with soap and water for at least 20 seconds or use hand sanitizers with at least 60% alcohol immediately after touching these surfaces. Shelters provided additional hand-washing stations in addition to normal restroom facilities.
- Individual meals were distributed without buffet set-up or queue area.
- Cots were spaced further apart to allow for physical distancing. FEMA recommends 110 sq ft (10 m^{2}) per person for long-term sheltering.
- Face coverings were required.
- Pets were excluded from Red Cross shelters.

United States gulf coast evacuees were urged to go to a friend or relative's home or a hotel, and consider the shelter a last resort because of COVID-19 risks; although shelters might open for families, who could be housed together in tents inside shelter facilities if absolutely necessary.
