= McManus House =

McManus House may refer to:

- McManus House (Davenport, Iowa)
- Richardson House (Brunswick, Maine), also known as the Captain George McManus House
- George McManus House, Petoskey, Michigan
- Patrick F. McManus House, Phoenix, Oregon
