= Emigrant Lake (Oregon) =

Reservoir near Ashland, Oregon, US

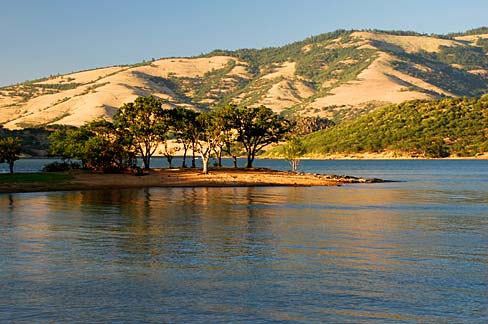
- Emigrant Lake

- Location within Oregon Location within the United States
- Location: Jackson County, Oregon
- Coordinates: 42°09′41″N 122°36′15″W
- Type: reservoir
- Primary inflows: Emigrant Creek
- Primary outflows: Emigrant Creek
- Basin countries: United States
- Surface area: 806 acres (3.26 km^{2})
- Water volume: 40,530 acre-feet (49,990,000 m^{3})
- Surface elevation: 2,241 feet (683 m)

Emigrant Lake is a reservoir located 5 miles (8 km) southeast of Ashland, Oregon, at the southern end of the Rogue Valley. It has an elevation of 2,241 feet (683 m) above sea level. The lake has an average surface area of 806 acres (3.26 km^{2}), and an average volume of 40,530 acre-feet (49,990,000 m^{3}). The lake is impounded by Emigrant Lake Dam, which stands 205 feet (62 m) above the surrounding farmland, and is located on Emigrant Creek and Sampson creek at the west side of the lake. The spillway is at the northern tip of the lake. Emigrant Creek is a tributary of Bear Creek.

== History ==
The reservoir was created in 1924 when the original 110-foot (34 m) concrete arch dam was built by the Talent Irrigation District for irrigation and flood control. In 1960, the United States Bureau of Reclamation enlarged the dam into the 204-foot (62 m) rock-filled structure standing today.

== Recreation area ==
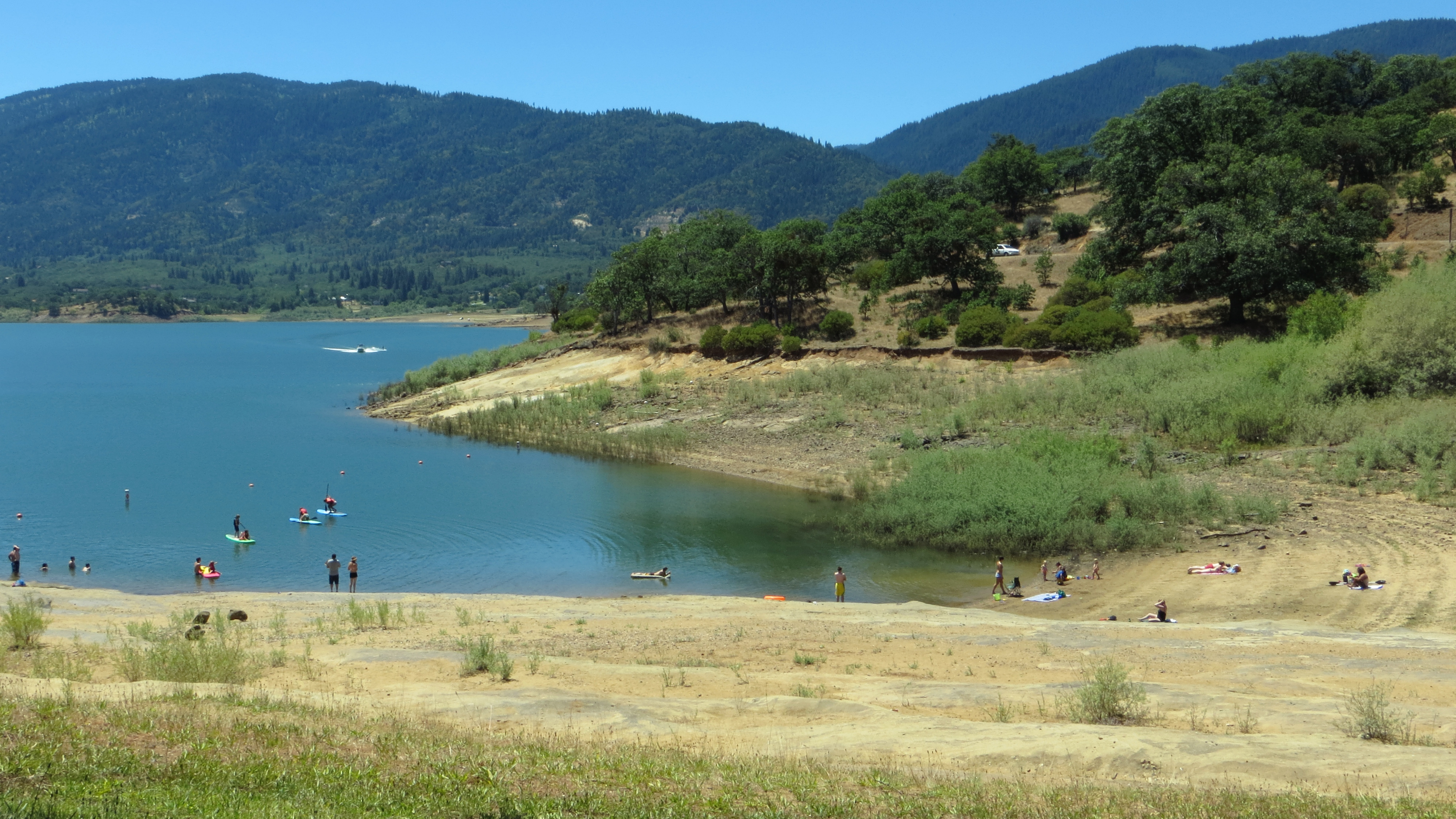
A beach on the shore of Emigrant Lake, Oregon.

Emigrant Lake features a large recreation area. This includes a 42-site, full-hookup campground, picnic areas, and two 280-foot (85 m) water slides open from Memorial Day to Labor Day. As of 2022, the slides are no longer operating due to the cost of repairs.

== Drought conditions and archaeological study ==
In October 2014, drought conditions prompted the Bureau of Reclamation to order an archaeological study to protect artifacts that have become exposed due to the lake being at less than 10 percent of capacity. During the 2020–21 North American drought, the lake reached 3% capacity.

== See also ==
- List of lakes in Oregon
