= Beeson =

Beeson may refer to:

== People ==
- Beeson (surname)

== Places ==
- Beeson, Devon, England
- Beeson, West Virginia

== Institutions ==
- Beeson Divinity School on the campus of Samford University in Alabama

== Other uses ==
- Beeson Covered Bridge, Indiana, USA
- Beeson House and Coach House, a landmark in Chicago
