= Beeson (surname) =

Beeson is a surname. Notable people with the surname include:

- Chalkley Beeson (1848–1912), sheriff of Dodge City, Kansas and proprietor of the Long Branch Saloon
- Charles Beeson (1957–2021), British television director
- Charles H. Beeson (1870–1949), American classical scholar
- Clare-Marie Beeson (born 1948), New Zealand born judge in the Hong Kong judiciary
- Cyril Beeson (1889–1975), English entomologist and horologist
- Diana Danielle (Diana Danielle Danny Beeson, born 1991), American-Malaysian actress
- Duane Beeson (1921–1947), American fighter ace in World War II
- Henry White Beeson (1791–1863), member of the U.S. House of Representatives
- Jack Beeson (1921–2010), American composer
- John Beeson (1803–1889), British-American abolitionist and supporter of Native American rights
- Marc Beeson (born 1954), American country music singer and songwriter
- Mark Beeson (born 1952), British professor in Political Science and International Relations at the University of Western Australia
- Paul Beeson (1921–2001), British cinematographer
- Paul Bruce Beeson (1908–2006), American physician
- Robert Beeson, American music executive
- Ronald Beeson (1936–1995), English cricketer
- Terry Beeson (born 1955), former American football linebacker
- Trevor Beeson (1926–2023), English priest and writer, Dean of Winchester 1987–96
- Loren Beeson (born 1992), American novelist
