= 2020 Oregon wildfires =

Natural disasters in the USA

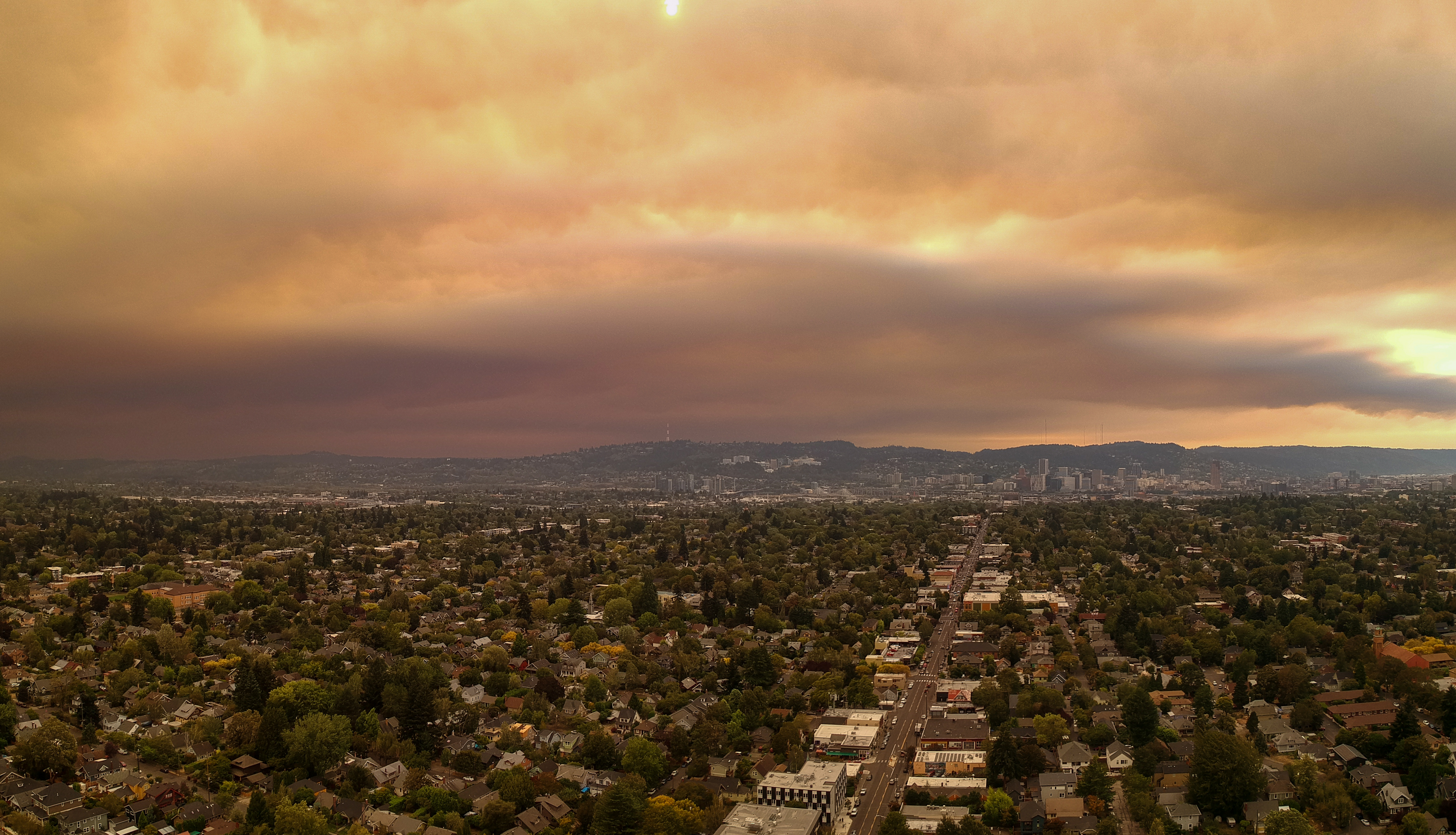
- Smoke-filled skies over downtown Portland, viewed from southeast Portland, on September 9, 2020

Statistics
- Total fires: 2,027
- Total area: 1,221,324 acres (494,252 ha)

Impacts
- Deaths: 11
- Structures destroyed: 3,000+

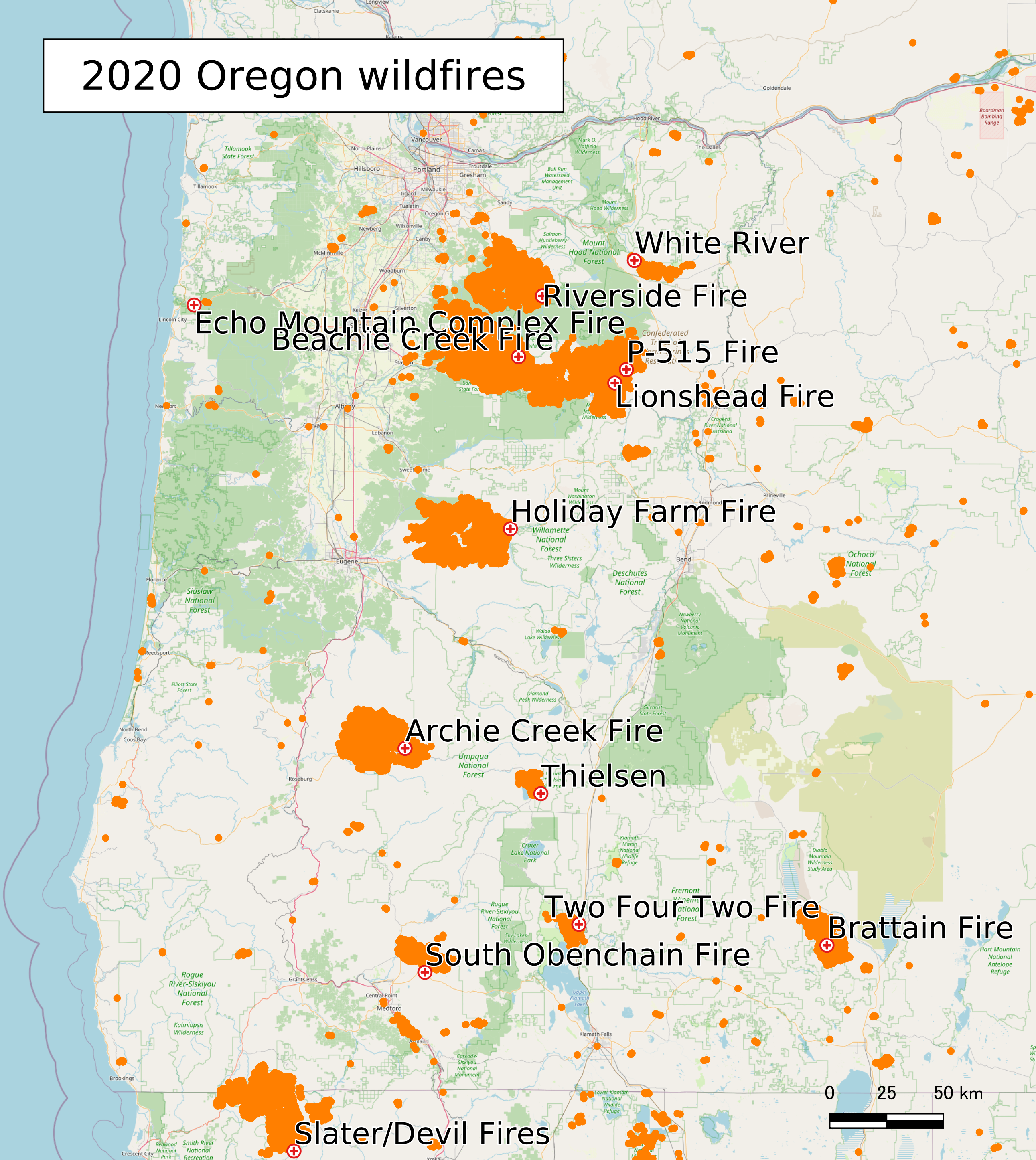
Map of 2020 Oregon wildfires

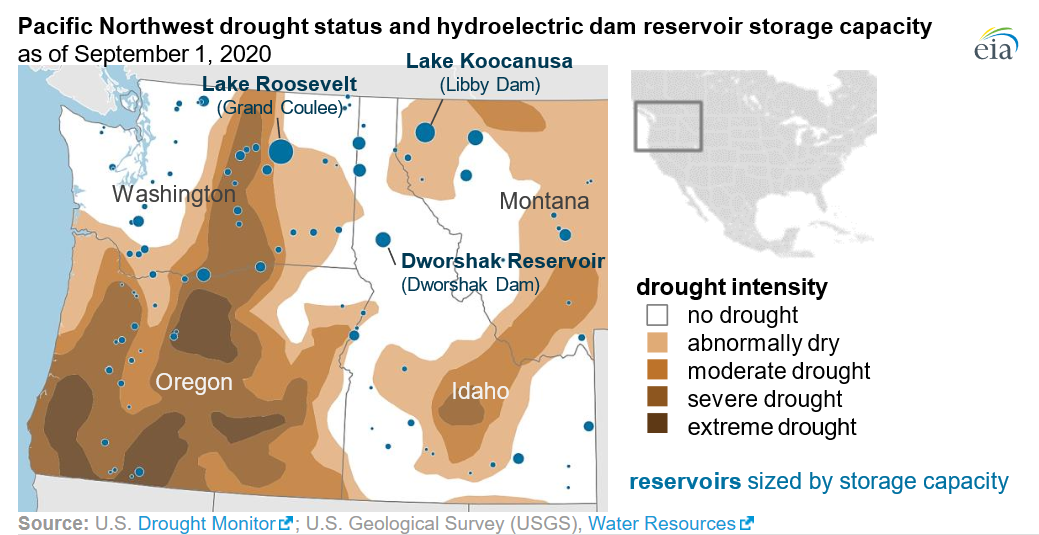
Drought intensity in the Pacific Northwest as of September 1, 2020

The 2020 Oregon wildfire season was the most destructive on record in the state of Oregon. The season is a part of the 2020 Western United States wildfire season. The fires killed at least 11 people, burned more than 1,000,000 acres (400,000 ha) of land, and destroyed thousands of homes.

== Background ==
"Fire season" in Oregon typically begins in mid-May and ends with the first rains that normally begins in late September. Drought, snowpack levels, and local weather conditions play a role in Oregon's fire season, particularly in Eastern and Southwest Oregon. During peak fire season from July to September, most wildfires are caused by lightning, while ignitions in the early and later parts of the season are related to humans. Warm, dry conditions in summer heighten the wildfire risk. After over 100 years of fire suppression and prevention of all fires, there is now an abundance of fuel. Climate change is leading to a reduced snowpack with an earlier and reduced snowmelt, so there is a higher risk for areas that receive wildfires.

== Timeline ==
The Oregon Department of Forestry declared fire season beginning on July 5, 2020, signaling the end of unregulated debris burning outdoors.

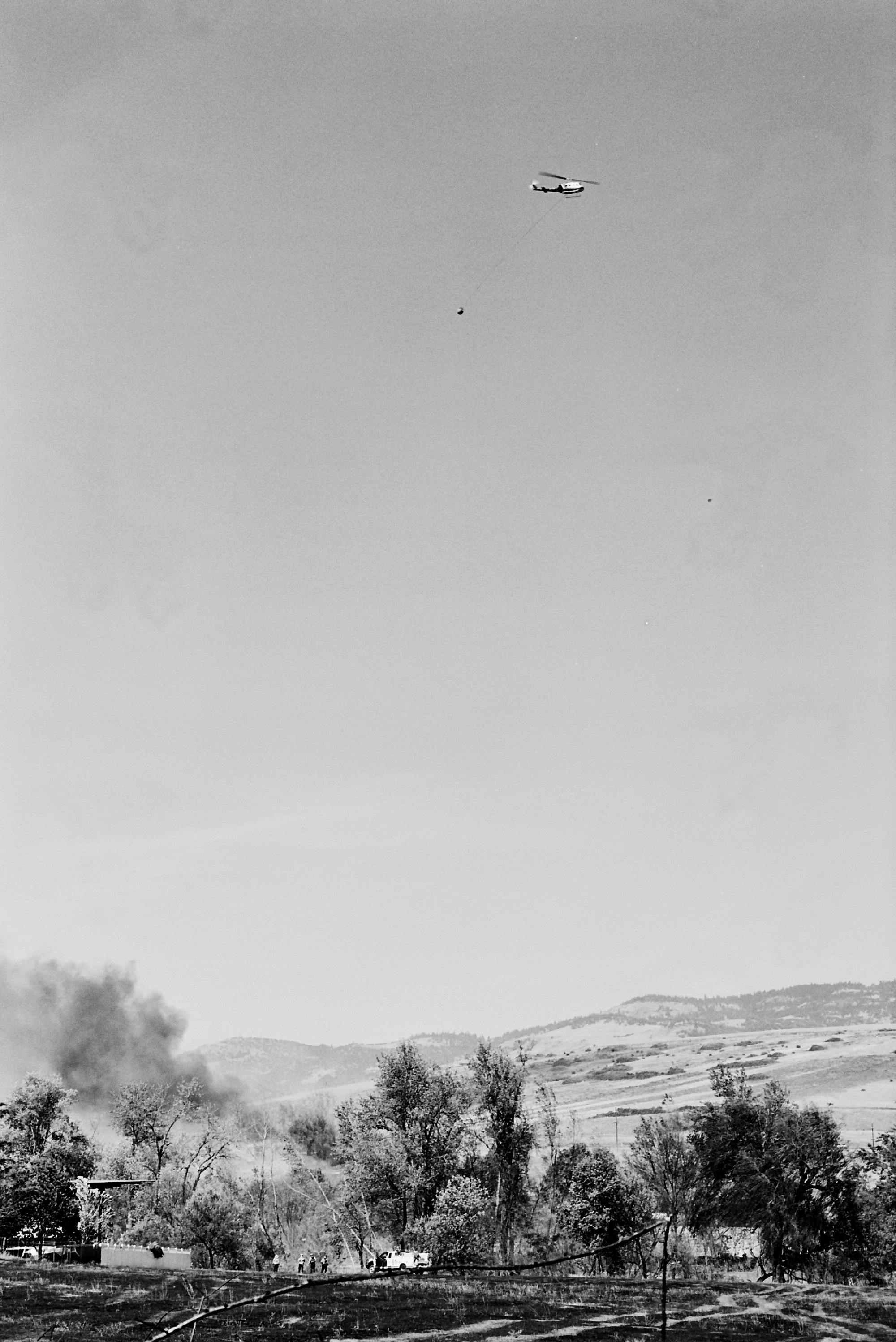
A helicopter carries water over the Almeda Fire at its point of origin in Ashland, Oregon, on September 8, 2020.

In early September, unusually high winds and continued dry weather caused the rapid expansion of multiple wildfires in Oregon. Over 1,000,000 acres were burned, and about 40,000 people were evacuated, with about 500,000 people in evacuation warning areas. The cities of Phoenix, Talent, Detroit, Idanha, and Gates in Oregon were substantially destroyed by the Almeda Drive and Santiam Fires respectively. State-wide, at least 7 people have been killed.

In the Almeda Drive Fire area — between Ashland, Talent, and Phoenix — more than 2,800 structures were destroyed. Around the South Obenchain Fire, which stretched from Shady Cove nearly to Butte Falls, 153 structures were lost. Jackson County Sheriff Nathan Sickler said that these numbers do not differentiate between homes, businesses, outbuildings, and other structures. Assessing the precise nature of those structures lost would fall to local teams in the days and weeks ahead.

Officials stated that the Almeda Drive Fire was human-caused. On September 11, a man was arrested for arson, for allegedly starting a fire that destroyed multiple homes in Phoenix and merged with the Almeda Drive Fire. A separate criminal investigation into the origin point of the Almeda Drive Fire in Ashland was ongoing as of September 2020.

== Causes ==
Through the end of July 2020, 90% of Oregon's wildfires had been caused by humans versus a yearly average of 70%, possibly because of increased outdoor recreation due to the COVID-19 pandemic.

== Rumors and theories ==
Rumors spread on social media that antifa activists were deliberately setting fires and preparing to loot property that was being evacuated. Some residents refused to evacuate based on the rumors, choosing to defend their homes from the alleged invasion. Authorities pleaded with residents to ignore the rumors. One Facebook post shared thousands of times falsely stated, "KXL Radio in Portland reported today that Firefighters are now being shot at by suspected Antifa and BLM members." QAnon followers participated in the misinformation, with one false claim that six antifa activists had been arrested for setting fires amplified by Q specifically. There were also rumors that members of far-right groups had started some of the fires, though authorities labeled the claims as false, saying that people needed to question claims that they found on social media.

Senator Jeff Merkley, (D-OR) decried President Donald Trump's comments blaming forest management for the fires as a "devastating lie.” Speaking on This Week with George Stephanopoulos, Merkley blamed climate change for the fires.

One of the major fires, the Almeda fire in Southern Oregon, was worsened by a second blaze that was allegedly the result of arson. The first origin point of the fire was still under active investigation as of late 2020, and arson was suspected there, as well.

Several small brush fires in Portland that were quickly put out were also the result of arson by a suspect who was apprehended, released, and then started several more.

== List of wildfires ==
The following is a list of fires that burned more than 1,000 acres, or produced significant structural damage or loss of life.

Name	County	Acres	Start date	Containment date (Note: Containment means that fire crews have established and secured control lines around the fire's perimeter. These lines are artificial barriers, like trenches or cleared vegetation, designed to stop the fire's spread, or natural barriers like rivers. Containment reflects progress in managing the fire but does not necessarily mean the fire is starved of fuel, under control, or put out.)	Notes	Ref
Neals Hill	Harney	3,391	August 5	August 13	Caused by lightning.	
Frog	Crook	4,020	August 16	August 31	Caused by lightning.	
Green Ridge	Jefferson	4,338	August 16	September 1	Caused by lightning.	
Indian Creek	Malheur	48,128	August 16	September 16	Human-caused.	
P-515	Jefferson	4,607	August 16	November 13	Caused by lightning; merged into the eastern portion of the combined Santiam Fire on September 11.	
Lionshead	Jefferson, Linn, Marion, Wasco	204,469	August 16	November 13	Caused by lightning; merged with the Beachie Creek Fire on September 8; the combined fires were briefly renamed Santiam Fire, 280 structures destroyed, 10 injuries.	
Beachie Creek	Clackamas, Linn, Marion	193,573	August 16	October 28	Unknown cause; merged with the Lionshead Fire on September 8, which were briefly named the Santiam Fire; 1,323 structures destroyed, 10 injuries, 5 fatalities.	
White River	Wasco	17,442	August 17	November 13	Caused by lightning, 1 structure destroyed, 2 injuries, 1 firefighter fatality.	
Laurel	Wheeler	1,257	August 19	August 31	Caused by lightning.	
Holiday Farm	Lane, Linn	173,393	September 7	October 26	Unknown cause, 768 structures destroyed, 6 injuries, 1 fatality.	
Brattain	Lake	50,951	September 7	October 6	Human-caused, 1 structure destroyed.	
Two Four Two	Klamath	14,473	September 7	October 10	Unknown cause, 48 structures destroyed.	
Echo Mountain Complex	Lincoln	2,552	September 7	September 21	Unknown cause, 293 structures destroyed.	
Slater	Josephine	157,220	September 8	November 12	Originally started in California then spread to Josephine County.	
Chehalem Mountain–Bald Peak	Washington	2,000	September 8	September 14	Caused by campfire on private property.	
Riverside	Clackamas	138,054	September 8	December 3	Human-caused, 139 structures destroyed, 4 injuries.	
Thielsen	Douglas	9,975	September 8	November 16	Unknown cause, 4 injuries.	
Almeda Drive	Jackson	3,200	September 8	September 14	Human-caused, suspected arson, 3,000+ structures destroyed, body found near origin of the fire, active crime scene investigation, 3 fatalities.	
South Obenchain	Jackson	32,671	September 8	October 3	Unknown cause, 89 structures destroyed.	
Archie Creek	Douglas	131,542	September 8	November 16	Unknown cause, 111 structures destroyed, 10 injuries, 1 firefighter fatality.	
Leslie Gulch	Malheur	5,147	November 5	November 16	Human-caused.	

== See also ==
- August 2020 California lightning wildfires
- 2020 Western United States wildfires
- Western US wildfire trends
