= Vizzini (disambiguation) =

Vizzini is a town and comune in the province of Catania, on the island of Sicily. It may also refer to:

- Vizzini, character in William Goldman's novel, see The Princess Bride
- Vizzini (surname)
