= Armadillo Technical Institute =

Armadillo Community Charter School

Location
- 106 Rose Street; Phoenix, (Jackson County), Oregon 97535; United States
- Coordinates: 42.272216°N 122.818667°W

Information
- Type: Public
- School district: Phoenix-Talent School District
- Director: Rachel Garner
- Grades: 9-12
- Enrollment: 110
- Mascot: Armadillo
- Website: http://www.armadillotech.org/

Armadillo Community Charter School (ACCS), formerly known as Armadillo Technical Institute (ATI), is a small public charter school in Phoenix, Oregon, United States. It enrolled 110 students in grades 9–12 and provides a GED preparation program as of 2020. The current director is Rachel Garner.

ACCS opened in 2000 as Armadillo Technical Institute with the mission to help students who needed an alternative to traditional high school and flexible paths to high school completion. In the 2018–19 school year, the school brought back its GED Program. ACCS's diploma-seeking program specializes in helping students graduate early or rapidly recover credit. Graduation rates increased 20% in the 2019-2020 school year

== Academics ==
Armadillo Community Charter School is an accredited high school through Cognia, which allows the school to award credit and all types of Oregon Diplomas. They offer all credit types and courses required for graduation in the state of Oregon, and ACCS is adept at helping students earn credit through proficiency, work experience, and the pursuit of individual interests through Independent Projects. ACCS staff utilize trauma-informed practices to help students engage in standards-based learning and build new academic and life skills. As reported by the Oregon Department of Education, 44% of ACCS seniors graduated with an Oregon Diploma, while another 42% "completed" high school with either a diploma after their 4th year of high school or a GED.

== Culture ==
Armadillo Community Charter School is known for its small school setting and welcoming culture. Focus is given to community building, social-emotional growth, and interpersonal skills. Students have access to a full-time mental health professional, laundry and self-care facilities, a school-based health clinic, breakfast and lunch meals provided, college and career counseling and support, and a school community that is dedicated to their success.
