= Tolman Creek =

Neil Creek river tributary in Oregon, United States

Coordinates: 42°10′45″N 122°38′58″W

Tolman Creek is a stream in the U.S. state of Oregon. It is a tributary to Neil Creek.

Tolman Creek was named in 1852 after James C. Tolman.
