= Patrick F. McManus House =

Historic house in Oregon, United States

- U.S. National Register of Historic Places
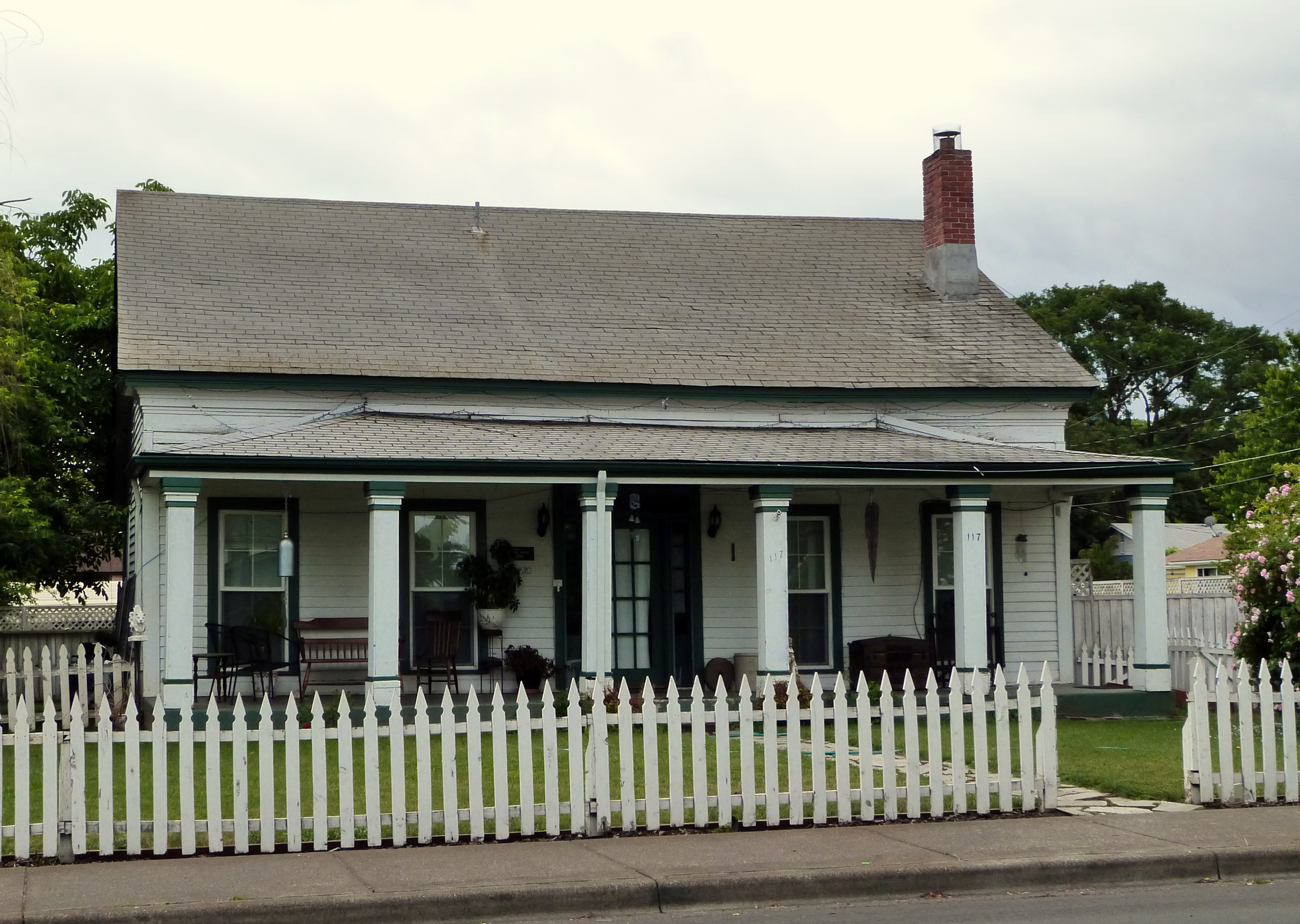

- Location within Oregon Location within the United States
- Location: 117 W. 1st Street; Phoenix, Oregon
- Coordinates: 42°16′22″N 122°48′54″W
- Area: 0.4 acres (0.16 ha)
- Built: 1855
- Built by: McManus, Patrick F.
- Architectural style: Classical Revival
- NRHP reference No.: 78002293
- Added to NRHP: March 8, 1978

The Patrick F. McManus House (also known as the Hiram Colver House) was built sometime between 1853 and 1855 by sutler and prospector Patrick F. McManus. McManus was one of the first of a group of white men in 1853 to reach what is now called Crater Lake as part of the Hillman group of prospectors. It sits on the Corner of 1st and Church Streets in Phoenix, Oregon and was built on the corner of one of the first donation land claims in the area belonging to Samuel Colver. McManus sold the home back to the Colver family in about 1857 for the use of the widow and children of Samuels deceased brother Hiram. Patrick F. McManus then went on the gold strike in Yreka, California, served as a sutler during the Modoc War and was killed in the Yreka area while driving a team and hauling mail.

The home was added to the National Register of Historic Places in 1978, through the research of Barbara Bateman. It was included in the Historic American Buildings Survey in 1934, done during the Works Progress Administration. Photos and detailed drawings are stored in the Library of Congress
