= Dry Well Creek =

- Location of the mouth of Dry Well Creek in Oregon

Location
- Country: United States
- State: Oregon
- County: Harney

Physical characteristics
- Source: Dry Well Spring
  - location: Malheur National Forest
  - coordinates: 43°54′07″N 119°23′31″W
  - elevation: 5,696 ft (1,736 m)
- Mouth: Emigrant Creek
  - coordinates: 43°53′03″N 119°25′06″W
  - elevation: 5,000 ft (1,500 m)

Dry Well Creek is a stream in Harney County, Oregon, United States in the Harney Basin of Eastern Oregon. Its mouth is at an elevation of 5,000 feet (1,500 m). It is among streams in the drainage basin of Malheur Lake, a Great Basin water body with no outlet.

Dry Well Creek is an intermittent fish-bearing stream that flows into Emigrant Creek, a tributary of the Silvies River. The creek is part of a watershed restoration project. Resident aquatic species in the project area include Great Basin redband trout, Malheur mottled sculpin, speckled and longnose dace, redside shiners, bridgelip suckers, Columbia spotted frogs, crayfish and western pearlshell mussels.

== See also ==
- List of rivers of Oregon
