= Holiday Farm Fire =

2020 wildfire in the U.S. state of Oregon

- Part of the 2020 Oregon wildfires
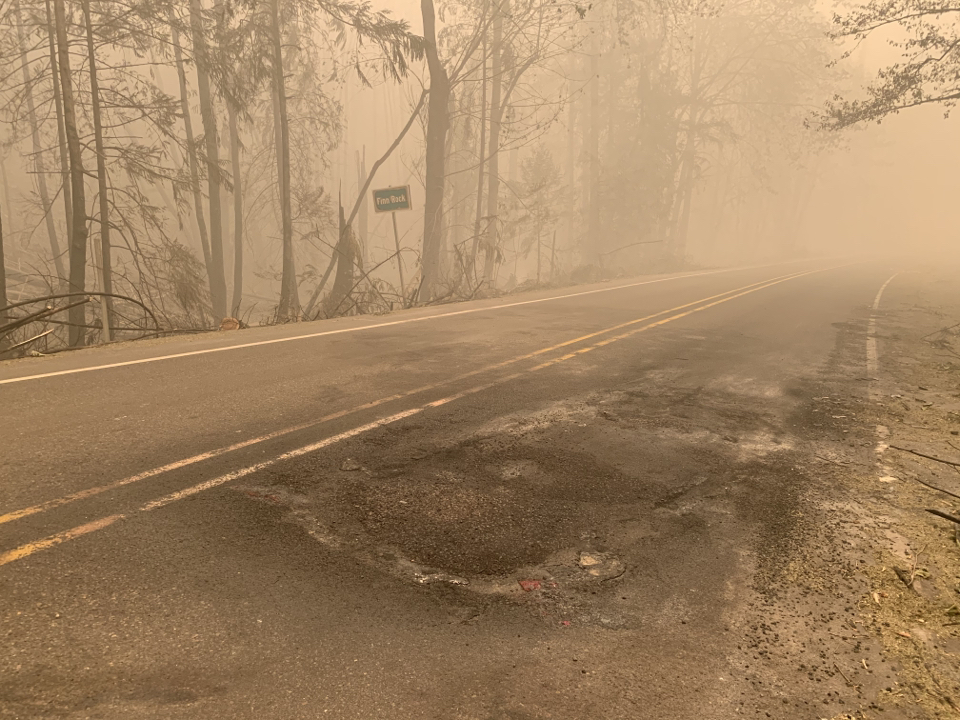
- Oregon Route 126 at Finn Rock on September 12, 2020
- Date: September 7, 2020 - October 29, 2020
- Location: Lane and Linn counties, Oregon, U.S.
- Coordinates: 44.172°N 122.231°W

Statistics
- Burned area: 173,393

Ignition
- Cause: fallen power lines

Map
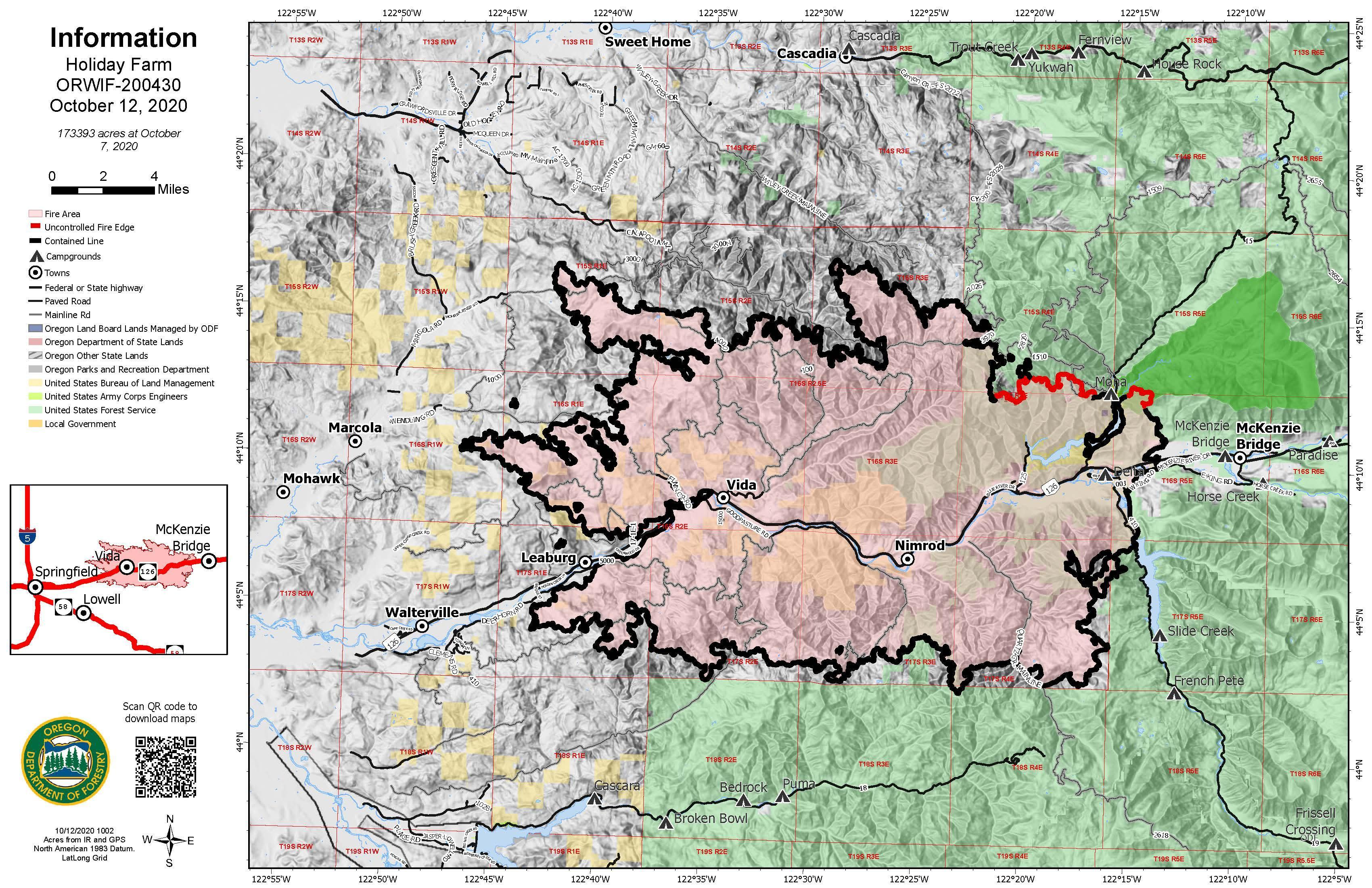
- Map of the Holiday Farm Fire as of October 12, 2020

- Location of the fire's origin in western Oregon

The Holiday Farm Fire occurred in the U.S. state of Oregon in 2020. It ranks among the largest wildfires in Oregon history, burning a total of 173,393 acres (70,170 ha) centered on the McKenzie River valley in Lane County.

Beginning near the Holiday Farm RV Resort in Rainbow on the evening of September 7, 2020, due to fallen power lines, the fire spread rapidly down the McKenzie valley and up into the densely wooded foothills on both sides of the river and Oregon Route 126. Driven by unusually strong winds from the east during the often-driest time of year in western Oregon, the fire grew most extensively on September 8 and was estimated at 105,000 acres (42,000 ha) in size by the morning of September 9. Many people evacuated to Springfield. Most structures in the community of Blue River were destroyed, as were numerous properties in nearby communities.

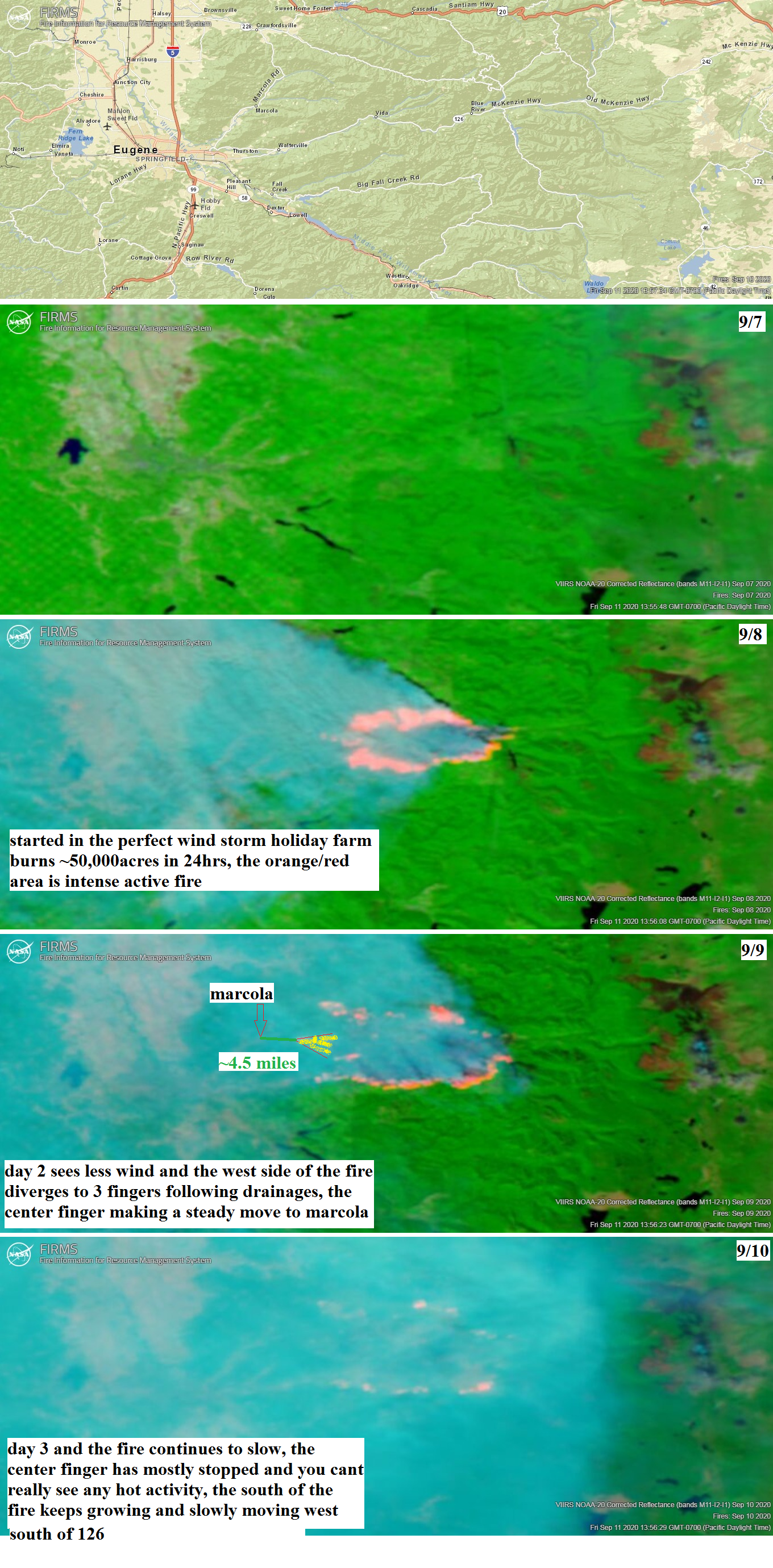
Clips from NASA FIRMS satellite imagery showing the fire progression

== See also ==
- 2020 Oregon wildfires
- Santiam Fire
