= Archie Creek Fire =

Part of the 2020 Oregon Wildfires

- OR Hwy 138E - Debris blocking highway near Susan Creek, Sept. 10, 2020. (ODOT photo)
- Date: September 7 – November 16, 2020
- Location: Douglas County, Oregon, USA

Statistics
- Total area: 131,542 acres
- Burned area: Umpqua National Forest

Impacts
- Deaths: 0
- Structures destroyed: 109 homes, 143 outbuildings

Ignition
- Cause: Suspected utility equipment failure

The Archie Creek Fire was a wildfire that burned in Douglas County, Oregon, United States, during Labor Day weekend of 2020. It was one of the most destructive fires in the county's history, ultimately burning over 131,000 acres and displacing residents in and east of the community of Glide.

== Progression ==
The fire began in the Umpqua National Forest on September 7, 2020, near French Creek. It was followed by two additional fires near Star Mountain and Archie Creek, which quickly merged on September 9 to form the Archie Creek Fire. The fire exhibited extreme behavior, "expanding by roughly 72,000 acres within the first 12 hours and reaching 100,000 acres in its initial 24 hours". High winds, extreme temperatures, and drought conditions contributed to the rapid spread of the blaze.

Archie Creek Fire
Land Ownership	Acres
Private	63,847
Roseburg Bureau of Land Management	40,429
Umpqua National Forest	26,645
Undetermined	620
State	39
Total Acres Burned	131,580

== Response and recovery ==
The response involved coordination between Douglas County officials, local fire departments, the Oregon Department of Forestry, the U.S. Forest Service, and other agencies. Emergency shelters were established at the Douglas County Fairgrounds, and animal rescue efforts extended to livestock and fish hatcheries.

Following containment on November 16, 2020, recovery efforts began, including hazardous waste cleanup, ash removal, and road repairs. A two-phase cleanup was implemented with assistance from Federal Emergency Management Agency (FEMA) and the State of Oregon.

== Ecological consequences ==
The fire severely affected critical wildlife habitats, including areas for the Northern Spotted Owl and Red Tree Vole. Watershed quality was compromised, with significant risk of landslides and erosion.

== Cause and legal proceedings ==
Initially, the cause of the Archie Creek Fire was listed as "under investigation". However, subsequent lawsuits and settlements have shed light on the likely origin of the fire. Multiple lawsuits alleged that PacifiCorp, operating as Pacific Power, failed to shut off its electrical equipment during extremely high-risk fire conditions over Labor Day weekend in 2020, despite warnings from the National Weather Service.

Plaintiffs claimed the utility company neglected to de-energize power lines and failed to properly trim hazard trees and manage vegetation near electrical infrastructure. These conditions are believed to have led to power equipment sparking fires during high winds, contributing to the rapid spread of the Archie Creek Fire.

== Settlements ==
- December 6, 2023: PacifiCorp agreed to a $299 million settlement with over 460 individuals who lost property or were displaced due to the fire.
- December 18, 2023: The company also reached a $250 million settlement with ten timber companies that sustained losses to commercial forestlands.
- February 2025: A jury awarded nearly $50 million in damages to seven survivors of the 2020 Oregon wildfires, adding to PacifiCorp's financial liabilities related to the fire.

In addition to these settlements, the U.S. federal government has filed a separate lawsuit seeking to recover fire suppression and restoration costs associated with the blaze's impact on public lands.

== See also ==
- 2020 Oregon wildfires
- 2020 Western United States wildfire season
