= Talent, Oregon =

- City
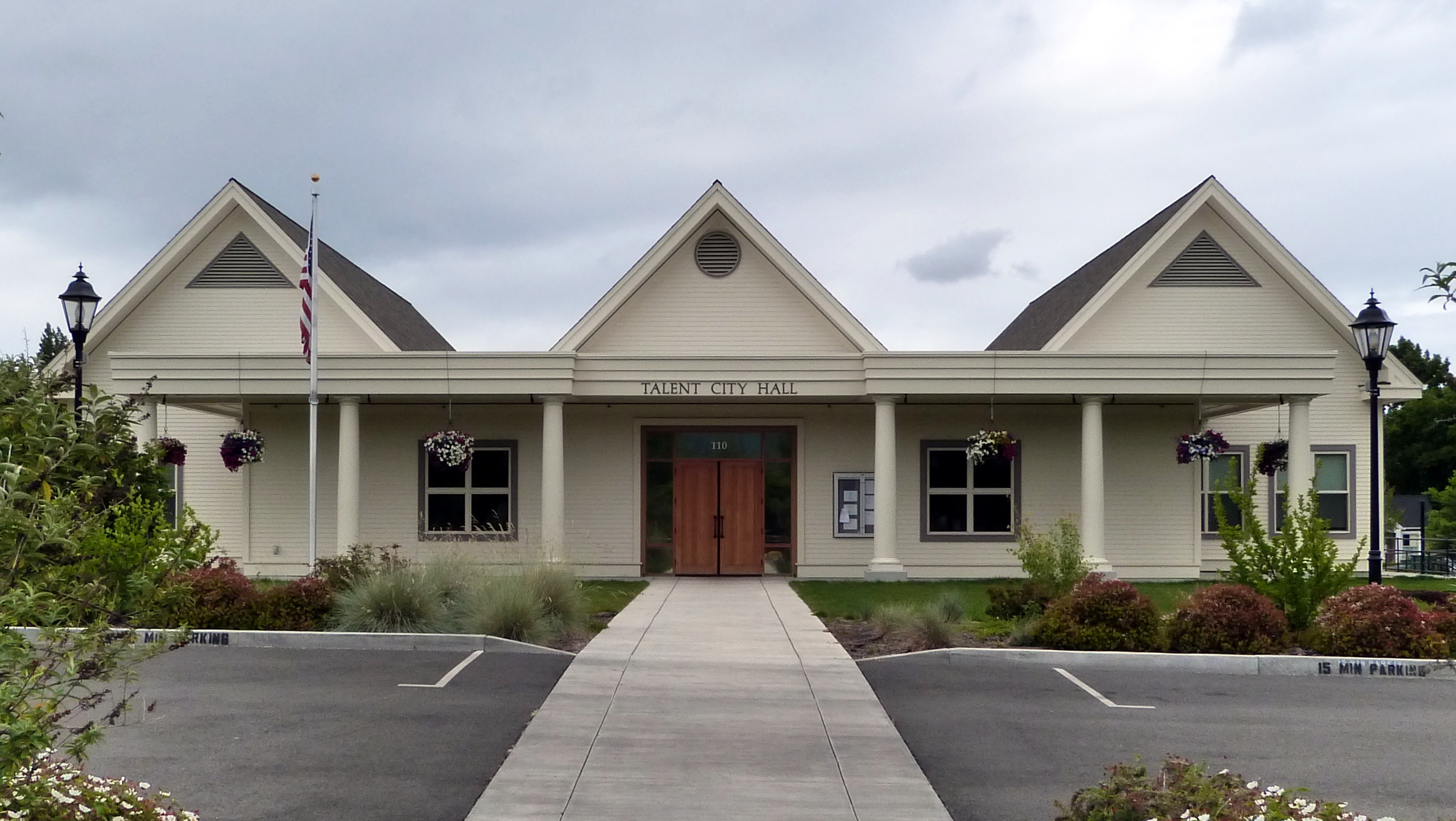
- Talent City Hall (2013)

- Location in Oregon
- Coordinates: 42°14′24″N 122°46′56″W
- Country: United States
- State: Oregon
- County: Jackson
- Incorporated: 1910

Area
  - Total: 1.33 sq mi (3.44 km^{2})
  - Land: 1.33 sq mi (3.44 km^{2})
  - Water: 0 sq mi (0.00 km^{2})
- Elevation: 1,637 ft (499 m)

Population (2020)
  - Total: 6,282
  - Density: 4,723.4/sq mi (1,823.72/km^{2})
- Time zone: UTC-8 (Pacific)
  - Summer (DST): UTC-7 (Pacific)
- ZIP code: 97540
- Area code: 541
- FIPS code: 41-72500
- GNIS feature ID: 2412031
- Website: cityoftalent.org

Talent is a city in Jackson County, Oregon, United States. The population was 6,282 at the 2020 census.

== History ==
A. P. Tallent, an East Tennessee native who settled in Oregon in the 1870s, platted the city in the 1880s. He wanted to name it Wagner but was overruled by postal officials, who preferred Talent, dropping one of the L's. The post office opened at this location in 1883. Earlier names for the settlement were Eden District and Wagner Creek.

=== 2020 fire ===
On September 8, 2020, roughly a third of Talent, along with neighboring Phoenix and parts of Medford and Ashland, were destroyed by the Almeda Drive Fire. On September 11, 2020, authorities said they were preparing for a mass fatality incident. As of September 11, 600 homes and 100 commercial buildings have been destroyed by the Almeda Drive Fire, but on September 18, that number was updated to 2,800. Officials stated that the Almeda Drive Fire was human-caused. On September 11, a man was arrested for arson, for allegedly starting a fire that destroyed multiple homes in Phoenix and merged with the Almeda Drive Fire. A separate criminal investigation into the origin point of the Almeda Drive Fire in Ashland is ongoing.

== Geography ==
According to the United States Census Bureau, the city has a total area of 1.33 square miles (3.44 km^{2}), all of it land.

The city is south of Medford, about halfway between Phoenix, to the north, and Ashland, to the south, along Interstate 5 and Oregon Route 99. This is toward the southern end of the Rogue River Valley, near the Siskiyou Mountains and the border with California.

Wagner Creek, a tributary of Bear Creek, joins the larger stream at Talent. Wagner was the name of a family of pioneer settlers who lived here before Talent became a city. The Bear Creek Greenway, a biking and hiking trail connecting Ashland, Phoenix, Medford, and Central Point along Bear Creek, also passes through Talent.

=== Climate ===
This region experiences warm to hot and dry summers, with average temperatures above 81.6 °F (27.6 °C). According to the Köppen Climate Classification system, Talent has a warm-summer Mediterranean climate, abbreviated "Csb" on climate maps.

Climate data for Talent, Oregon
Month	Jan	Feb	Mar	Apr	May	Jun	Jul	Aug	Sep	Oct	Nov	Dec	Year
Record high °F (°C)	70 (21)	78 (26)	82 (28)	88 (31)	101 (38)	105 (41)	106 (41)	108 (42)	103 (39)	97 (36)	79 (26)	70 (21)	108 (42)
Mean daily maximum °F (°C)	45.3 (7.4)	51.3 (10.7)	57.9 (14.4)	65.6 (18.7)	72.9 (22.7)	80.4 (26.9)	89.6 (32.0)	88.2 (31.2)	80.0 (26.7)	66.7 (19.3)	53.3 (11.8)	45.6 (7.6)	66.4 (19.1)
Mean daily minimum °F (°C)	29.7 (−1.3)	31.8 (−0.1)	34.0 (1.1)	37.7 (3.2)	42.6 (5.9)	48.1 (8.9)	52.3 (11.3)	51.0 (10.6)	45.6 (7.6)	39.1 (3.9)	33.7 (0.9)	31.0 (−0.6)	39.7 (4.3)
Record low °F (°C)	−1 (−18)	−1 (−18)	17 (−8)	20 (−7)	23 (−5)	29 (−2)	32 (0)	34 (1)	27 (−3)	13 (−11)	3 (−16)	−4 (−20)	−4 (−20)
Average precipitation inches (mm)	2.41 (61)	1.95 (50)	1.62 (41)	1.25 (32)	1.44 (37)	1.04 (26)	0.34 (8.6)	0.22 (5.6)	0.76 (19)	1.76 (45)	2.39 (61)	2.79 (71)	17.97 (457.2)
Average snowfall inches (cm)	3.10 (7.9)	1.50 (3.8)	0.70 (1.8)	0.10 (0.25)	0 (0)	0 (0)	0 (0)	0 (0)	0 (0)	0 (0)	0.10 (0.25)	0.90 (2.3)	6.40 (16.3)
Source 1:
Source 2:

== Demographics ==
Historical population
Census	Pop.	Note	%±
1920	278		—
1930	421		51.4%
1940	381		−9.5%
1950	739		94.0%
1960	868		17.5%
1970	1,411		62.6%
1980	2,577		82.6%
1990	3,274		27.0%
2000	5,589		70.7%
2010	6,066		8.5%
2020	6,282		3.6%
U.S. Decennial Census

=== 2020 census ===
As of the 2020 census, Talent had a population of 6,282. The median age was 41.9 years. 17.7% of residents were under the age of 18 and 23.3% of residents were 65 years of age or older. For every 100 females there were 89.6 males, and for every 100 females age 18 and over there were 84.5 males age 18 and over.

99.9% of residents lived in urban areas, while 0.1% lived in rural areas.

There were 2,846 households in Talent, of which 22.6% had children under the age of 18 living in them. Of all households, 35.4% were married-couple households, 19.4% were households with a male householder and no spouse or partner present, and 34.4% were households with a female householder and no spouse or partner present. About 34.4% of all households were made up of individuals and 18.7% had someone living alone who was 65 years of age or older.

There were 3,011 housing units, of which 5.5% were vacant. Among occupied housing units, 56.5% were owner-occupied and 43.5% were renter-occupied. The homeowner vacancy rate was 1.7% and the rental vacancy rate was 4.5%.

Racial composition as of the 2020 census
Race	Number	Percent
White	4,934	78.5%
Black or African American	30	0.5%
American Indian and Alaska Native	89	1.4%
Asian	94	1.5%
Native Hawaiian and Other Pacific Islander	9	0.1%
Some other race	429	6.8%
Two or more races	697	11.1%
Hispanic or Latino (of any race)	1,039	16.5%

=== 2010 census ===
As of the census of 2010, there were 6,066 people, 2,639 households, and 1,462 families living in the city. The population density was 4,560.9 inhabitants per square mile (1,761.0/km^{2}). There were 2,826 housing units at an average density of 2,124.8 per square mile (820.4/km^{2}). The racial makeup of the city was 87.0% White, 0.8% African American, 1.3% Native American, 0.9% Asian, 0.2% Pacific Islander, 5.9% from other races, and 3.9% from two or more races. Hispanic or Latino of any race were 15.6% of the population.

There were 2,639 households, of which 30.1% had children under the age of 18 living with them, 36.9% were married couples living together, 13.3% had a female householder with no husband present, 5.2% had a male householder with no wife present, and 44.6% were non-families. 33.5% of all households were made up of individuals, and 14.4% had someone living alone who was 65 years of age or older. The average household size was 2.29 and the average family size was 2.96.

The median age in the city was 38.4 years. 24% of residents were under the age of 18; 8.4% were between the ages of 18 and 24; 26.4% were from 25 to 44; 24.9% were from 45 to 64; and 16.3% were 65 years of age or older. The gender makeup of the city was 46.6% male and 53.4% female.

=== 2000 census ===
As of the census of 2000, there were 5,589 people, 2,324 households, and 1,426 families living in the city. The population density was 4,433.6 inhabitants per square mile (1,711.8/km^{2}). There were 2,420 housing units at an average density of 1,919.7 per square mile (741.2/km^{2}). The racial makeup of the city was 87.30% White, 0.54% African American, 1.06% Native American, 0.36% Asian, 0.11% Pacific Islander, 7.91% from other races, and 2.74% from two or more races. Hispanic or Latino of any race were 12.40% of the population.

There were 2,324 households, out of which 30.7% had children under the age of 18 living with them, 43.9% were married couples living together, 13.4% had a female householder with no husband present, and 38.6% were non-families. 29.1% of all households were made up of individuals, and 14.3% had someone living alone who was 65 years of age or older. The average household size was 2.39 and the average family size was 2.95.

In the city, the population was 26.0% under the age of 18, 11.2% from 18 to 24, 27.3% from 25 to 44, 18.5% from 45 to 64, and 17.0% who were 65 years of age or older. The median age was 34 years. For every 100 females, there were 89.6 males. For every 100 females age 18 and over, there were 85.5 males.

The median income for a household in the city was $29,063, and the median income for a family was $33,333. Males had a median income of $24,781 versus $21,213 for females. The per capita income for the city was $16,271. About 12.4% of families and 15.4% of the population were below the poverty line, including 21.3% of those under age 18 and 8.4% of those age 65 or over.

== Education ==
Talent Elementary School and Talent Middle School are part of the Phoenix-Talent School District. High school students attend Phoenix High School in Phoenix. Phoenix-Talent Rising Academy is a virtual hybrid school in Phoenix.

== Notable people ==
- Robert Arellano (1969– ), author and professor
- John Beeson (1803–1889), abolitionist and Native American advocate
