= David Vizzini =

David Vizzini (born August 24, 1973, Medford, Oregon, United States) is a former American NCAA Div II All-American and Division I wrestling coach. His accomplishments include becoming one of few 4X Oregon State Champions 1988-1991, 2X NCAA Div II Regional Champion, 2X NCAA Div II All-American 1995 & 1996 for Portland State University, along with competing internationally.

== Youth ==
Vizzini was raised by his father, Chuck Vizzini, in Southern Oregon. He attended Phoenix High School and wrestled for Oregon Sports Hall of Fame coach Harry Mondale, where Vizzini captured four individual state titles (1988–1991). David won title in Freestyle and Greco-Roman, along with competing internationally in Cuba & Puerto Rico.

== College ==
Vizzini competed at Portland State University for years, winning two-time NCAA Div II Regional Championships and two-time NCAA Div II All-American.

Vizzini completed his academics at Southern Oregon University, earning a Bachelor of Science in Speech Communication (1997). Vizzini transitioned to California State University, Fullerton (CSUF) earning a Master of Arts in Rhetoric and Organizational Communication.

== Coaching ==
While pursuing an education at CSUF, Vizzini began his coaching career in 1998, taking on the head assistant coaching position behind Ardeshir Asgari from 1998–2001, and transitioned to Portland State University from 2002 to 2004 behind Marlin Grahn. In 2004 Vizzini started the non-profit Northern Elite Wrestling Academy, training at The Hoop in Beaverton, Oregon.
