= Bear Creek Greenway =

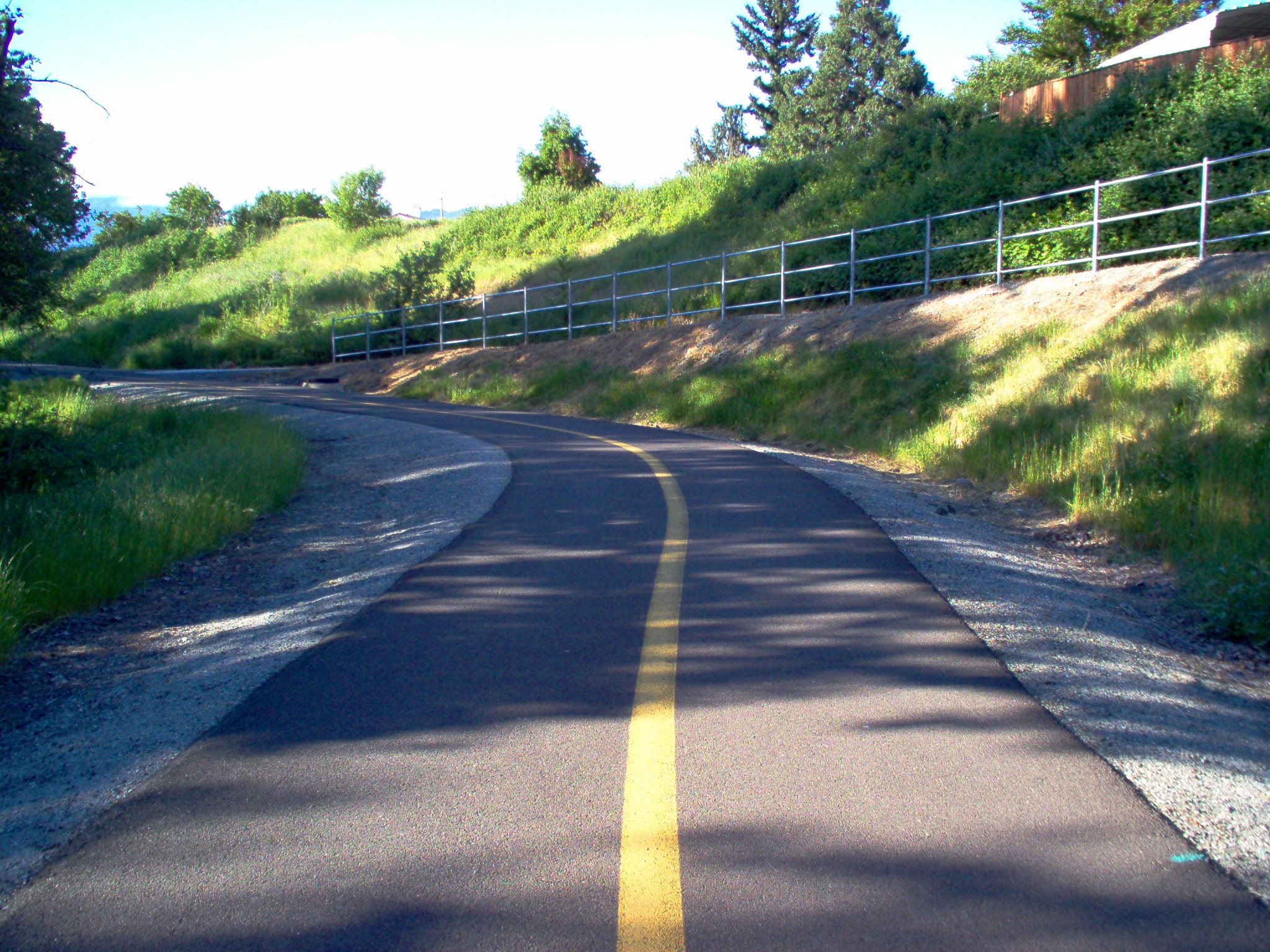
- Bear Creek Greenway near Phoenix, Oregon
- Length: 20 mi (32 km)
- Location: Jackson County, Oregon
- Trailheads: Ashland, Central Point
- Use: Cycling, Hiking
- Elevation change: 482 ft (147 m)
- Highest point: Ashland Dog Park trailhead
- Lowest point: Peninger Road trailhead
- Difficulty: Easy
- Season: Year-round
- Hazards: Sharp turns, blind corners, occasional root bumps and other rough surfaces; auto traffic at street crossing

The Bear Creek Greenway is a 20-mile (32 km) biking and hiking path extending from Ashland to Central Point in the U.S. state of Oregon. Passing through Talent, Phoenix, and Medford, it roughly parallels Bear Creek, a tributary of the Rogue River. The Greenway is divided into two lanes for bi-directional traffic and is inaccessible to motor vehicles (except for county maintenance).

== History ==
A bicycle-only path in the Medford area may have been discussed as early as 1899, when bicycles were increasing in popularity. Jackson County collected $500 from a tax on bicycles that year for construction of a path, but the project was not carried out. In 1973, former representative Al Densmore presented a bill to the Oregon Legislative Assembly, which authorized the Oregon Department of Transportation to build 3.4 miles (5.5 km) of the greenway that year.

Later funding for the Bear Creek Greenway came in increments, causing construction to take place sporadically over four decades. One source stated that even before Interstate 5 was built through the area a "Greenway Movement" was forming among supporters who desired "a chain of parks from Ashland to Rogue River connected by a trail". When Densmore presented his bill, Jackson County began a land acquisition program that led to completion of segments in 1973, 1980, 1995, and 1998.

By 2011, the Bear Creek Greenway was complete from Ashland to Central Point. All road crossings are handled by overpasses or underpasses except Suncrest Road near Talent, which requires crossing the street itself.

The Bear Creek Greenway Foundation is seeking funds to add an additional 1.4-mile (2.3 km) section between Pine Street and Upton Road in Central Point. The path may eventually link to the planned Rogue River Greenway along the Rogue River between Central Point and Grants Pass. Certain sections of the trail are being updated to prevent erosion from the varying levels of soil density throughout the different seasons. If completed, the combined trails would connect Ashland to Grants Pass with a continuous biking and hiking path largely protected from motorized traffic.

== Locations ==
Location	Coordinates	Trail location		Elevation			
Location	Coordinates	Ashland Dog Park trailhead	42°12′40.15″N 122°42′43.75″W	0.0	0	1,747	532
South Valley View Road	42°13′16.55″N 122°44′25.43″W	2.0	3.2	1,650	500		
West Valley View Road	42°14′43.87″N 122°46′33.77″W	4.75	7.64	1,567	478		
Fern Valley Road	42°16′48.87″N 122°49′10.57″W	8.3	13.4	1,465	447		
Barnett Road	42°18′56.39″N 122°50′59.47″W	11.75	18.91	1,393	425		
Table Rock Road	42°21′49.29″N 122°53′07.13″W	16.05	25.83	1,297	395		
Peninger Road trailhead (Central Point)	42°22′46.48″N 122°54′02.32″W	17.7	28.5	1,265	386		
