= Disaster victim identification =

Identifying human remains after an incident with multiple fatalities

Disaster victim identification (DVI) is the process of identifying the remains of people who have died in a mass fatality incident such as a plane crash or bomb blast. The process can be time-consuming to avoid mis-identification. Techniques include fingerprinting, use of dental records and DNA profiling.

The DVI process typically follows a structured four-phase approach: scene examination, post-mortem data collection, ante-mortem data collection, and reconciliation. Specialized DVI teams-often composed of forensic pathologists, odontologists, fingerprint experts, and DNA analysts – are deployed to manage this process. Coordination between international and national agencies is common during large-scale disasters, with standardized protocols guided by organizations such as INTERPOL, which issued its first DVI guidelines in 1984 and continues to update them regularly.

== See also ==
- Body identification
- Disaster Mortuary Operational Response Team
- Emergency management
- FBI Victims Identification Project
- Forensic archaeology
- Unidentified decedent
