= Almeda Drive Fire =

2020 Oregon wildfire

- Part of the 2020 Oregon wildfires
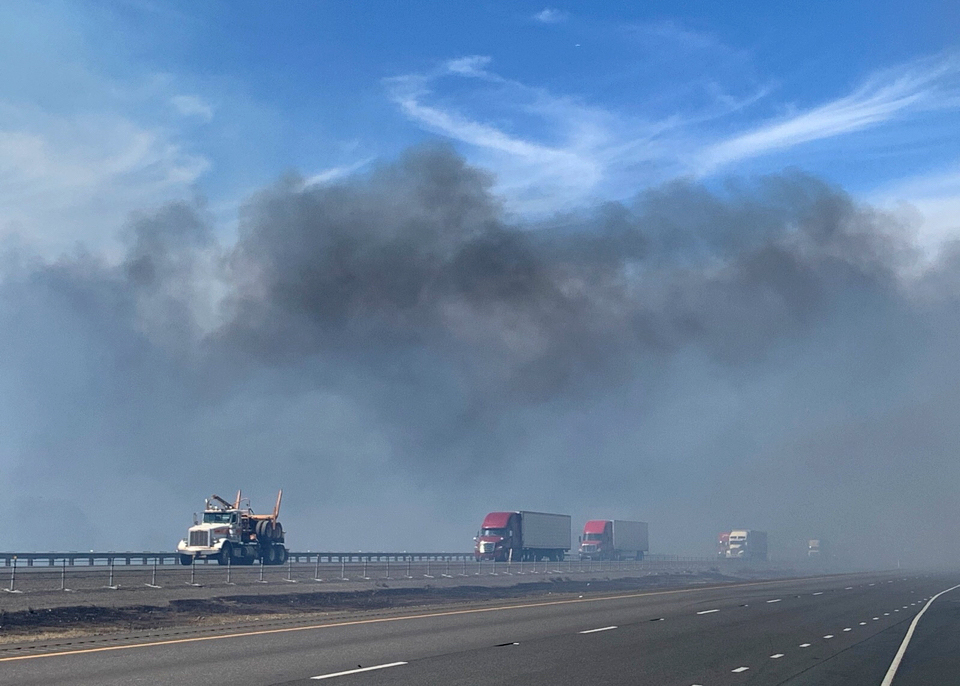
- Almeda Drive Fire smoke plume from Interstate 5
- Date: September 8 –; September 15, 2020; (7 days)
- Location: Jackson County, Oregon
- Coordinates: 42.2120°N 122.7141°W

Statistics
- Burned area: 3,200 acres (1,295 ha; 5 sq mi; 13 km^{2})

Impacts
- Deaths: 3
- Structures destroyed: 3,000+

Ignition
- Cause: Human origin

Map
- Location in Southern Oregon

The Almeda Drive Fire was a devastating wildfire in Jackson County, Oregon. The fire started on September 8, 2020 near Ashland, Oregon and was deemed to be of human origin.

Prior to the fire, most of the Pacific Northwest, including all of Oregon, was under drought conditions by spring due to below-average precipitation in the months prior.

The fire started behind Almeda Drive on September 8, 2020, at 11:07 AM. Within two hours, the fire had reached the south part of Talent, and four hours after it started, it was burning in Phoenix. Wind gusts of 40–45 miles (64–72 km) per hour and severe drought conditions contributed to the rapid spread. The fire was contained by September 15, 2020. The burn area was 3,200 acres (13 km^{2}), and over 3,000 structures were destroyed.

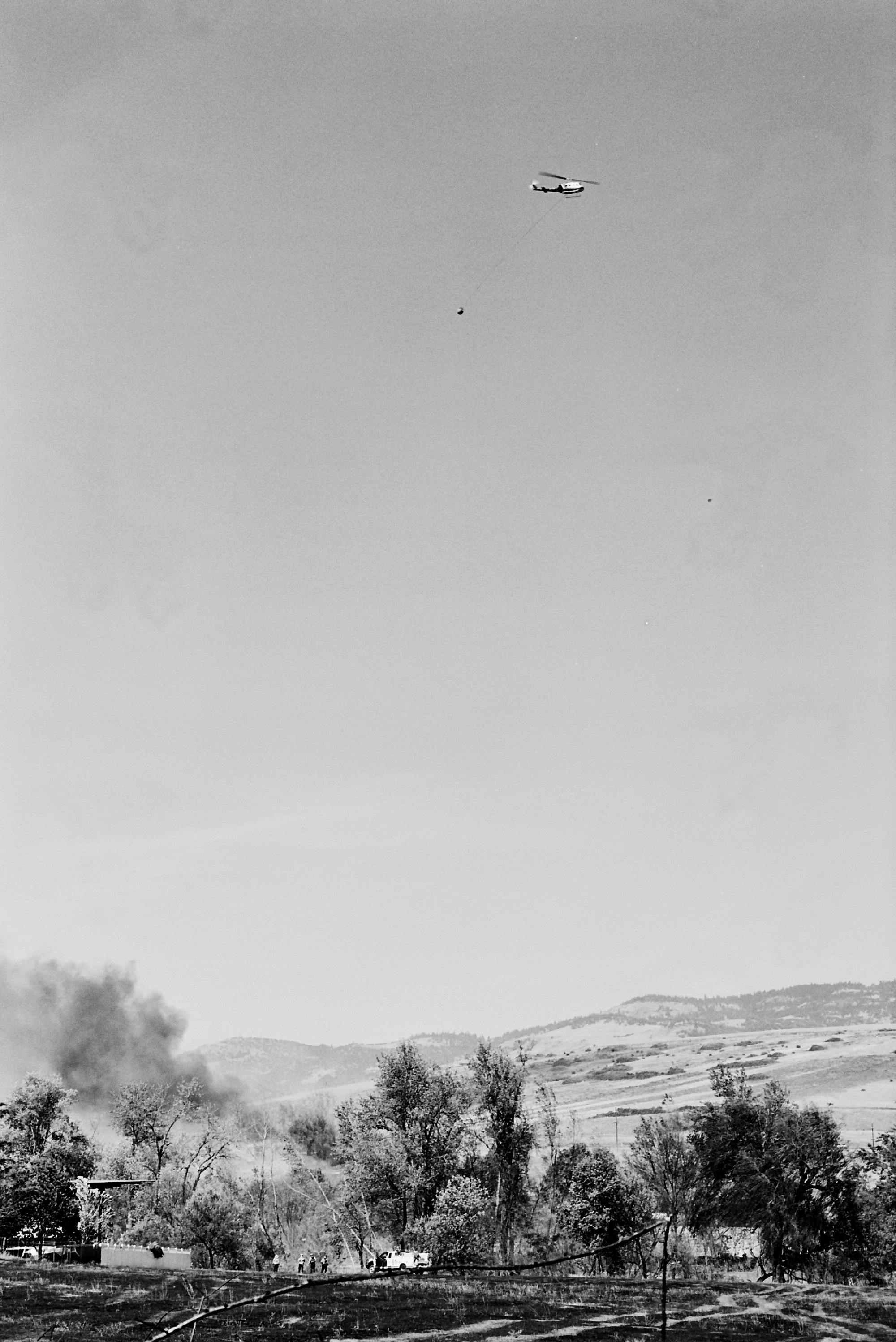
A helicopter carries water over 2020 Almeda Fire near its origin off Almeda Drive in Ashland, Oregon.

== See also ==
- List of Oregon wildfires
