= Neil Creek =

Stream in Oregon, US

Coordinates: 42°11′40″N 122°39′51″W

Neil Creek is a stream in the U.S. state of Oregon. It is a tributary to Bear Creek. Neil Creek was named in 1854 after Clairborne Neil, a pioneer and early resident of Ashland, Oregon.
