= Vizzini (surname) =

Vizzini is an Italian surname. Notable people with the surname include:

- Calogero Vizzini (1877–1954), Italian mob boss
- Carlo Vizzini (born 1947), Italian politician
- David Vizzini (born 1973), American wrestling coach
- Lorenzo Vizzini (born 1993), Italian songwriter
- Ned Vizzini (1981–2013), American writer
