= Mark Beeson =

British political scientist (born 1952)

Mark Beeson (born 1952) is an adjunct professor at the Australia-China Relations Institute, University of Technology Sydney. he was formerly a professor of International Politics at the University of Western Australia in Perth. He previously worked at Murdoch University, Griffith University and the University of Queensland in Australia, and the University of York and the University of Birmingham in the United Kingdom.

== Publications ==
Beeson is a prolific author and editor in International Relations and Asian Politics. He has published more than 200 articles and book chapters, and written or edited more than 20 books. His work often adopts a critical perspective, for example, challenging rosy assessments of progress in regional integration projects such as the Association for Southeast Asian Nations. He also has written widely and influentially on environmental threats and governance. Overall, his work has been cited by other academics more than 8,500 times. Some of his main publications include:

- Competing Capitalisms: Australia, Japan and Economic Competition in the Asia Pacific (Macmillan, 1999)
- Contemporary Southeast Asia: Regional Dynamics, National Differences (edited, Palgrave, 2004)
- Bush and Asia: America's Evolving Relations with East Asia (edited, Routledge, 2006)
- Regionalism, Globalization and East Asia: Politics, Security and Economic Development (Palgrave, 2007)
- Securing Southeast Asia: The Politics of Security Sector Reform (with Alex Bellamy, Routledge, 2008).
- Rethinking Global Governance Palgrave Macmillan, 2019).
- Environmental Populism: The Politics of Survival in the Anthropocene (Palgrave Macmillan, 2019).
- Environmental Anarchy? International Security in the 21st Century, (Bristol: Bristol University Press,2021).
