= McManus House (Davenport, Iowa) =

Historic house in Iowa, United States

- U.S. National Register of Historic Places
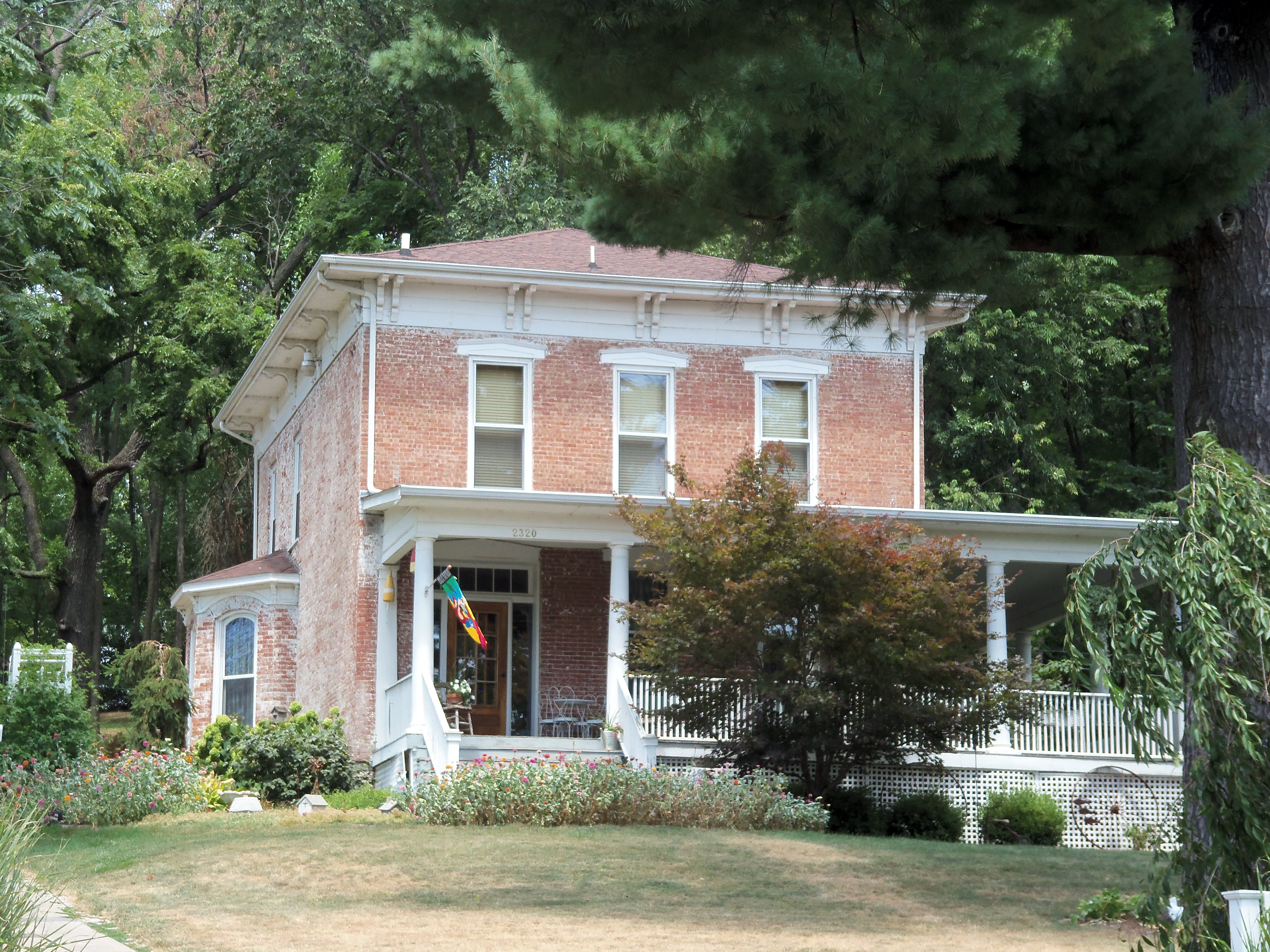

- Location within Iowa Location within the United States
- Location: 2320 Telegraph Road; Davenport, Iowa
- Coordinates: 41°31′27″N 90°36′48″W
- Area: 2 acres (0.81 ha)
- Built: 1855
- Architectural style: Italianate; Greek Revival
- MPS: Davenport MRA
- NRHP reference No.: 83002469
- Added to NRHP: July 7, 1983

The McManus House is a historic building located in the West End of Davenport, Iowa, United States. It has been listed on the National Register of Historic Places since 1983.

== History ==
James McManus, who built this house, moved to Davenport in the 1840s. He was engaged in farming and retail. McManus was elected to the Iowa General Assembly and served as a Scott County supervisor. His son Parker took over the estate when James died. Parker continued to operate the farm and he was also elected to the state legislature. At one time there were several estates in the West End that lined Telegraph Road at the base of the bluff and were home to prominent families such as the Putnams, Koenigs, Glasspells, and the Fejervarys. The McManus House is the only one that remains.

== Architecture ==
This house exemplifies the combination of the Italianate and the Greek Revival styles that were popular in Davenport in the mid-19th century. The two-story house is built of brick and is three bays wide with a doorway in the left bay. The simple bracketed cornice that rings the top of the house, and the low hipped roof evoke the Italianate style. The Greek Revival style is found in the simple window pediments and the wide, glass framed doorway. A porch wraps around the front of the house to the east side. It was built 40 to 50 years after the house and adds the Neoclassical style to the house.
