= George McManus House =

Historic house in Michigan, United States

- U.S. National Register of Historic Places
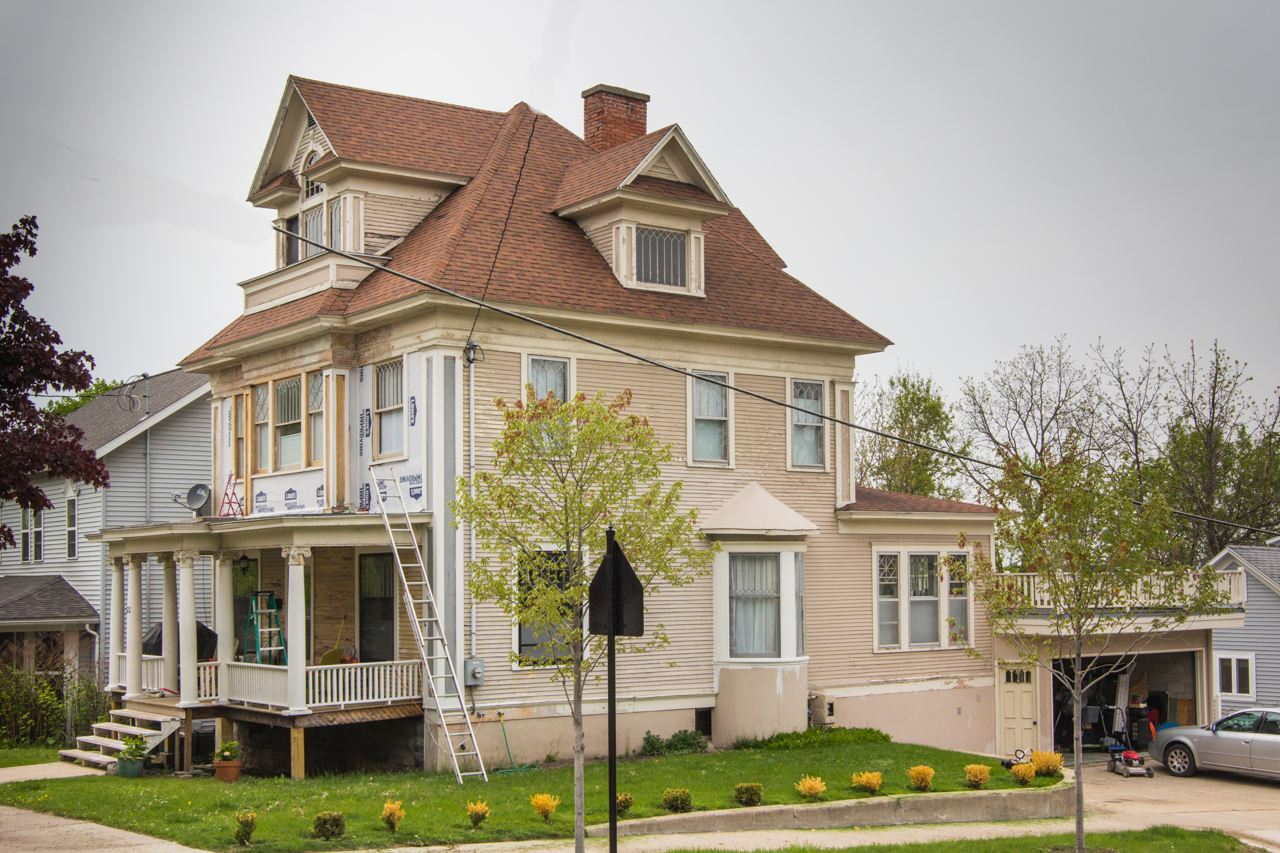

- Location within Michigan Location within the United States
- Interactive map
- Location: 121 State St., Petoskey, Michigan
- Coordinates: 45°22′19″N 84°57′33″W
- Area: 0.3 acres (0.12 ha)
- Architectural style: Colonial Revival, Prairie School
- MPS: Petoskey MRA
- NRHP reference No.: 86002026
- Added to NRHP: September 10, 1986

The George McManus House is a private house located at 121 State Street in Petoskey, Michigan. It was placed on the National Register of Historic Places in 1986.

The George McManus House is a 2 1/2-story Colonial Revival house with a hipped roof and a single-story addition in the rear. Each side of the roof has gabled dormers containing Palladian window units. The building is sheathed in clapboard, and has corner pilasters and a cornice on top. The front facade has an entry porch with Ionic columns. The windows have multiple vertical panes with a single-pane light on top.

The George McManus House was constructed c. 1910 for Geaorge McManus, the President of the Petoskey Garage and Sales Company, and of W.L. McManus Lumber Company. The house marries the basic Colonial Revival design with elements from the Prairie School.
