= Phoenix, Oregon =

- City
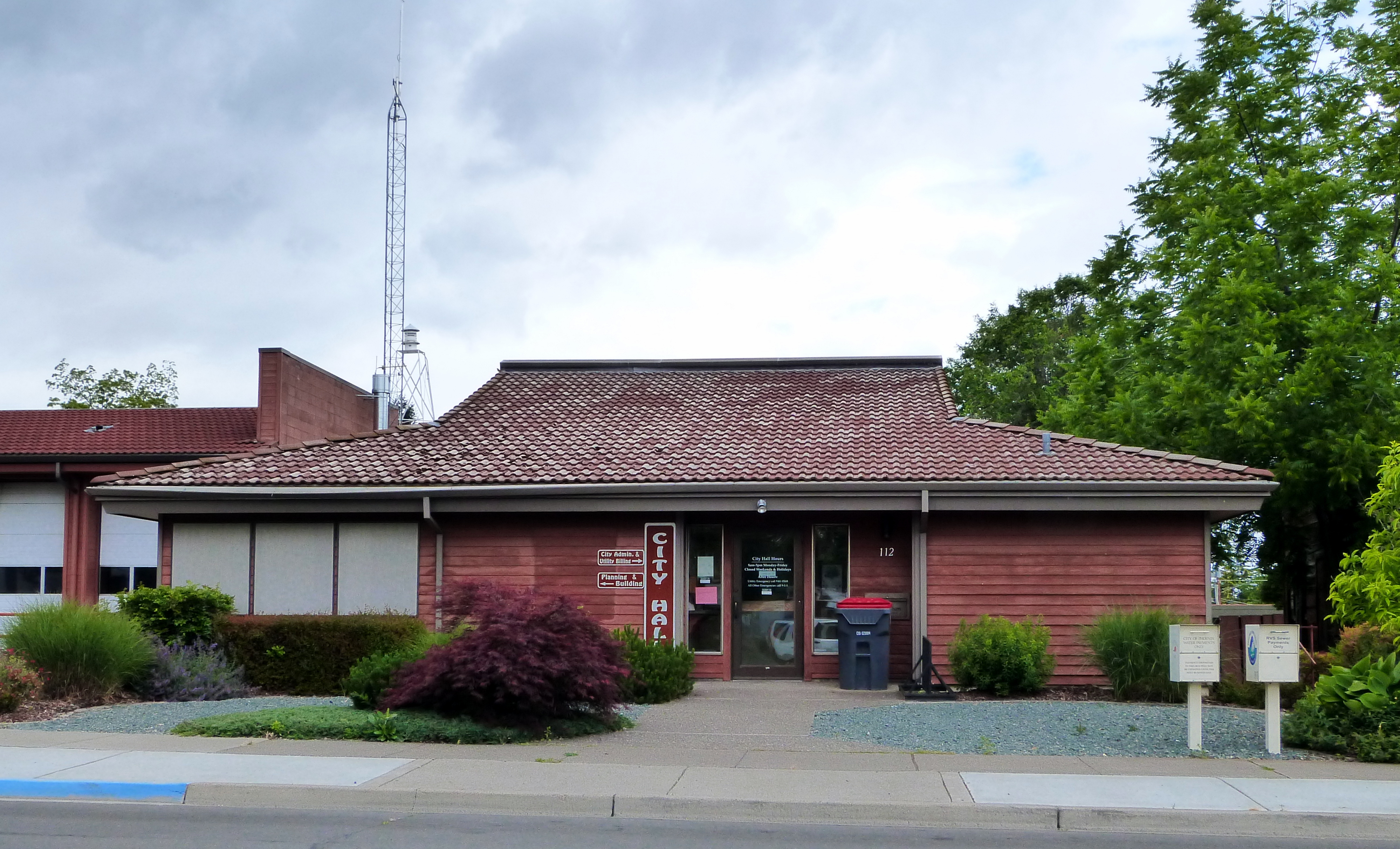
- Phoenix City Hall (2013)
- Motto: The Other Phoenix
- Location within County and State
- Coordinates: 42°16′29″N 122°48′55″W
- Country: United States
- State: Oregon
- County: Jackson
- Incorporated: 1910

Government
  - Mayor: Al Muelhoefer

Area
  - Total: 1.42 sq mi (3.69 km^{2})
  - Land: 1.42 sq mi (3.69 km^{2})
  - Water: 0 sq mi (0.00 km^{2})
- Elevation: 1,503 ft (458 m)

Population (2020)
  - Total: 4,475
  - Density: 3,137.6/sq mi (1,211.42/km^{2})
- Time zone: UTC-8 (Pacific)
  - Summer (DST): UTC-7 (Pacific)
- ZIP code: 97535
- Area codes: 541 and 458
- FIPS code: 41-57500
- GNIS feature ID: 2411415
- Website: phoenixoregon.gov

Phoenix is a city in Jackson County, Oregon, United States. The population was 4,475 at the 2020 census. Phoenix is a part of the Medford Metropolitan Statistical Area, in the Rogue Valley, and is 3 miles (5 km) southeast of Medford on Interstate 5.

== History ==
The area was settled c. 1850 by brothers Hiram and Samuel Colver. Samuel Colver laid out the town in 1854. Early residents included Milton Lindley, who operated a sawmill that provided timbers in 1855, for a blockhouse as well as a flouring mill owned by Sylvester M. Wait. For a time, the settlement was known locally as Gasburg after a talkative employee in the kitchen serving the mill hands. Wait, who was an agent for the Phoenix Insurance Company of Hartford, Connecticut, assigned the official name, Phoenix, to the community and, in 1857, to its post office. Waitsburg, Washington, was later named after Wait.

=== 2020 fire ===
On September 8, 2020, much of Phoenix, along with neighboring Talent and parts of Medford and Ashland, were destroyed by the Almeda Drive Fire. On September 11, 2020, authorities said they were preparing for a mass fatality incident. On September 11, it was reported that 600 homes and 100 commercial buildings were destroyed by the Almeda Drive Fire, but on September 18, that number was updated to 2,800. Officials stated that the Almeda Drive Fire was human-caused. On September 11, a man was arrested for arson, for allegedly starting a fire that destroyed multiple homes in Phoenix and merged with the Almeda Drive Fire. A separate criminal investigation into the origin point of the Almeda Drive Fire in Ashland was ongoing as of September 2020.

== Geography ==
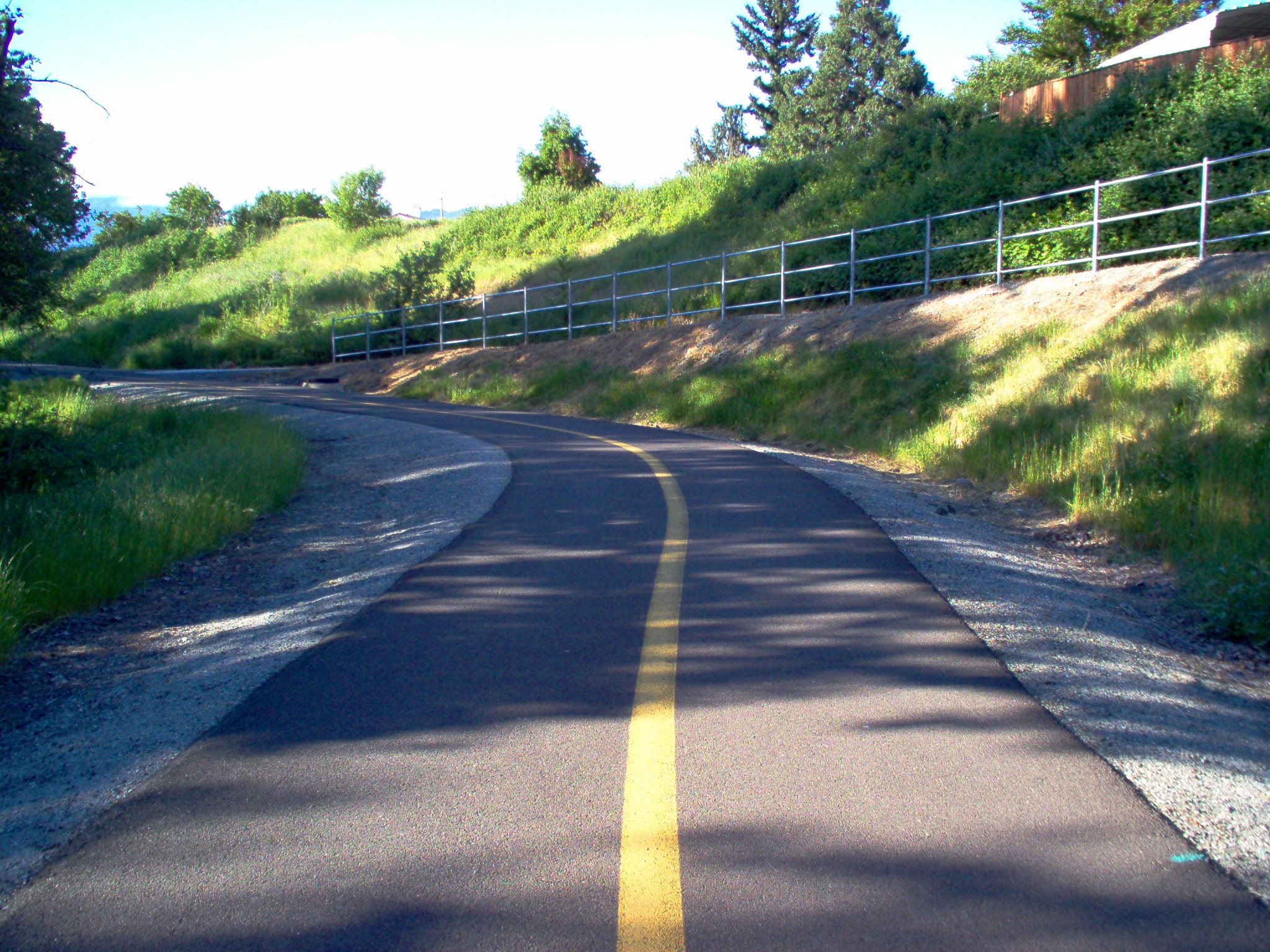
The Bear Creek Greenway in Phoenix

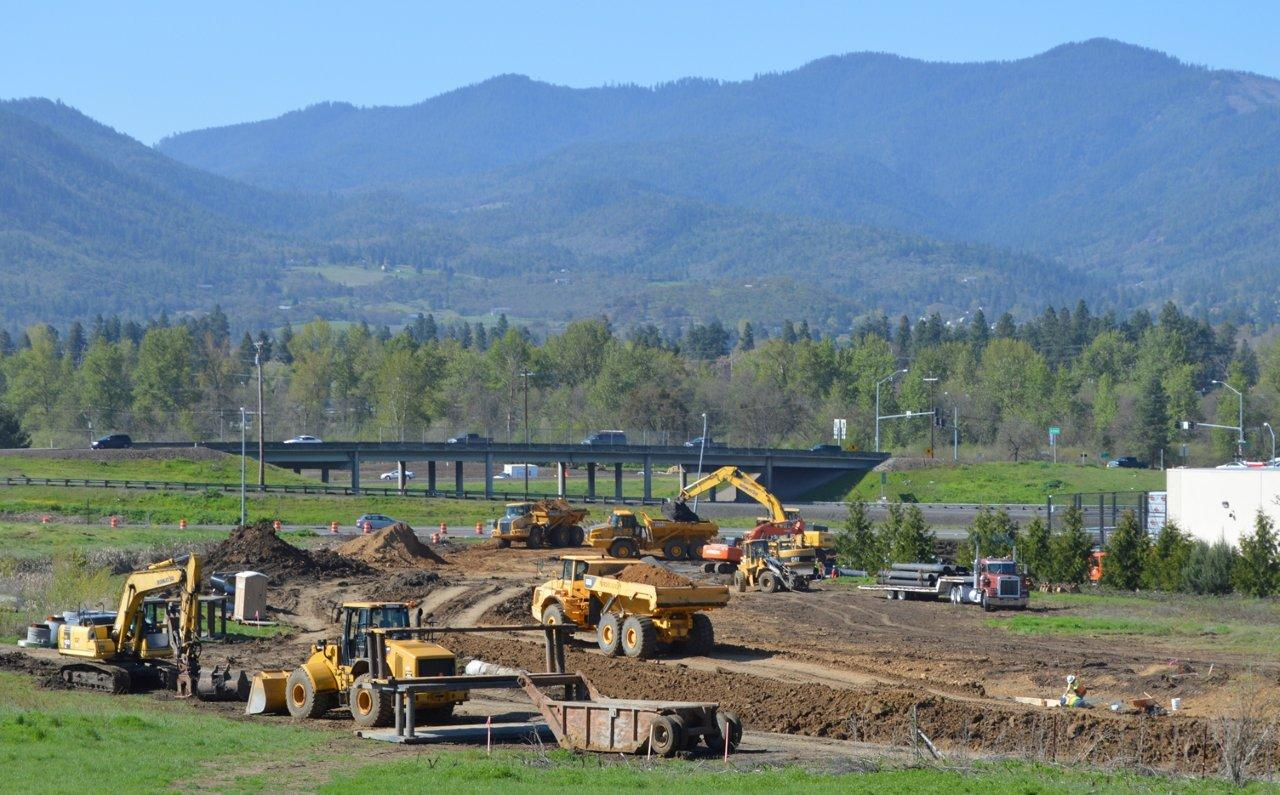
Construction work on Interstate 5 next to The Home Depot in Phoenix in 2014

According to the United States Census Bureau, the city has a total area of 1.44 square miles (3.73 km^{2}), all land.

The city is south of Medford and north of Talent and Ashland along Interstate 5 and Oregon Route 99. This is toward the southern end of the Rogue River Valley, near the Siskiyou Mountains and the border with California.

Coleman Creek, a tributary of Bear Creek, joins the larger stream at Phoenix. The Bear Creek Greenway, a biking and hiking trail connecting Ashland, Talent, Medford, and Central Point along Bear Creek, also passes through Phoenix.

=== Climate ===
This region experiences hot and dry summers, and cool and wet winters. According to the Köppen climate classification system, Phoenix has a hot-summer Mediterranean climate, abbreviated Csa on climate maps.

Phoenix's record-high temperature is 115 °F (46.1 °C) on June 27, 2021, and the record-low temperature is −8 °F (−22.2 °C) on December 9, 1972.

Climate data for Phoenix, Oregon
Month	Jan	Feb	Mar	Apr	May	Jun	Jul	Aug	Sep	Oct	Nov	Dec	Year
Record high °F (°C)	70 (21)	77 (25)	81 (27)	93 (34)	98 (37)	115 (46)	109 (43)	109 (43)	106 (41)	95 (35)	76 (24)	68 (20)	115 (46)
Mean daily maximum °F (°C)	47.1 (8.4)	53.2 (11.8)	58.6 (14.8)	64.5 (18.1)	71.2 (21.8)	78.9 (26.1)	86.4 (30.2)	87.0 (30.6)	79.4 (26.3)	67.2 (19.6)	51.1 (10.6)	45.7 (7.6)	65.9 (18.8)
Mean daily minimum °F (°C)	29.8 (−1.2)	32.2 (0.1)	34.4 (1.3)	37.7 (3.2)	42.2 (5.7)	47.5 (8.6)	51.2 (10.7)	50.4 (10.2)	44.1 (6.7)	37.1 (2.8)	32.8 (0.4)	30.4 (−0.9)	39.2 (4.0)
Record low °F (°C)	−1 (−18)	−1 (−18)	11 (−12)	22 (−6)	25 (−4)	27 (−3)	35 (2)	37 (3)	26 (−3)	17 (−8)	9 (−13)	−8 (−22)	−8 (−22)
Average precipitation inches (mm)	3.22 (82)	2.93 (74)	2.27 (58)	1.91 (49)	1.70 (43)	0.85 (22)	0.55 (14)	0.41 (10)	0.78 (20)	1.45 (37)	4.35 (110)	4.70 (119)	25.12 (638)
Average snowfall inches (cm)	1.6 (4.1)	0.7 (1.8)	0.2 (0.51)	0.1 (0.25)	0 (0)	0 (0)	0 (0)	0 (0)	0 (0)	0 (0)	0.2 (0.51)	0.9 (2.3)	3.7 (9.4)

== Demographics ==
Historical population
Census	Pop.	Note	%±
1880	277		—
1910	250		—
1920	159		−36.4%
1930	439		176.1%
1940	432		−1.6%
1950	746		72.7%
1960	769		3.1%
1970	1,287		67.4%
1980	2,309		79.4%
1990	3,239		40.3%
2000	4,061		25.4%
2010	4,538		11.7%
2020	4,475		−1.4%
U.S. Decennial Census

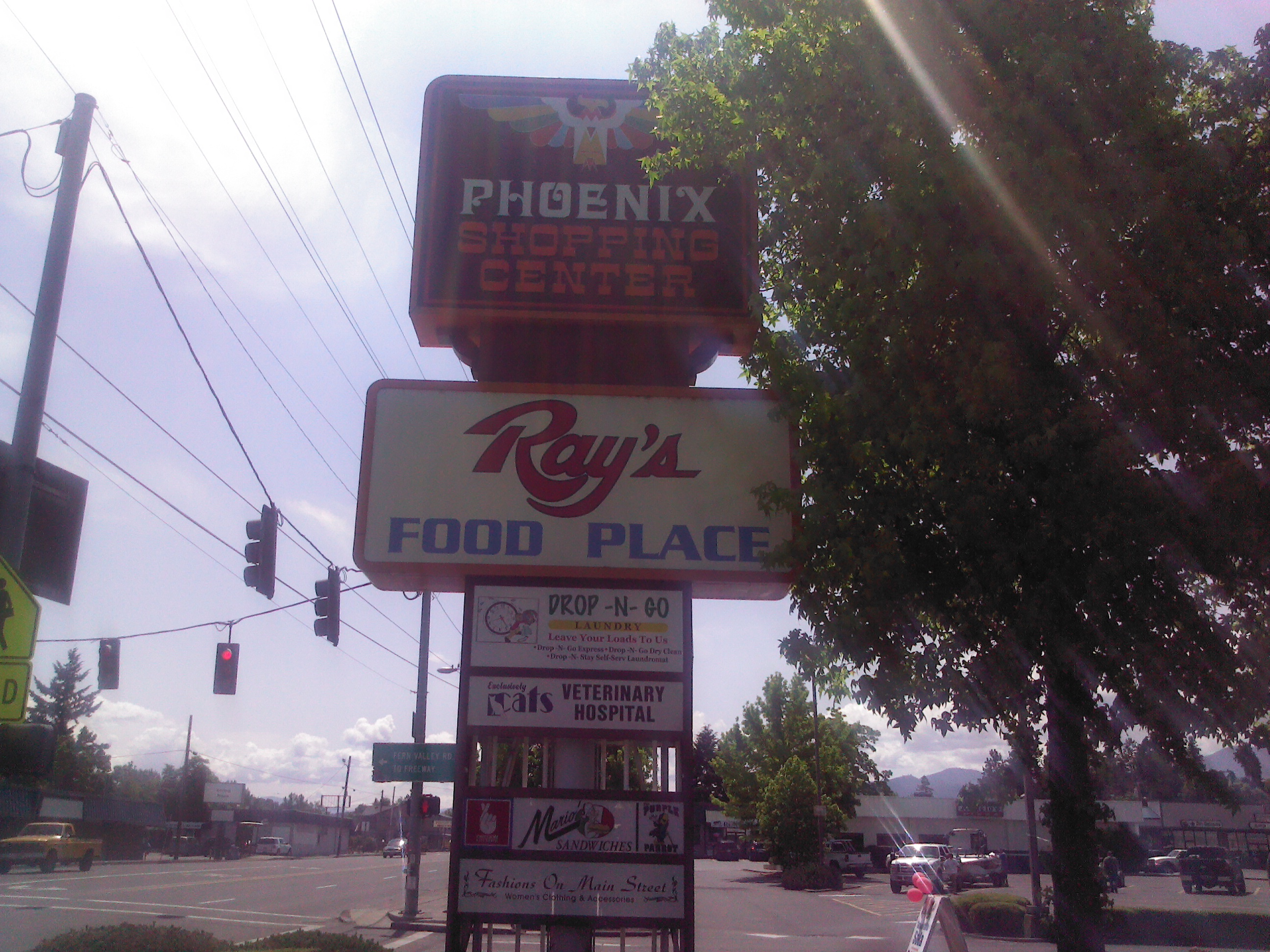
Phoenix Shopping Center sign in Phoenix

=== 2020 census ===
As of the 2020 census, Phoenix had a population of 4,475. The median age was 46.1 years. 17.8% of residents were under the age of 18 and 27.0% of residents were 65 years of age or older. For every 100 females there were 86.6 males, and for every 100 females age 18 and over there were 84.1 males age 18 and over.

99.8% of residents lived in urban areas, while 0.2% lived in rural areas.

There were 2,028 households in Phoenix, of which 23.8% had children under the age of 18 living in them. Of all households, 39.3% were married-couple households, 17.6% were households with a male householder and no spouse or partner present, and 34.3% were households with a female householder and no spouse or partner present. About 33.9% of all households were made up of individuals and 20.7% had someone living alone who was 65 years of age or older.

There were 2,118 housing units, of which 4.2% were vacant. Among occupied housing units, 62.9% were owner-occupied and 37.1% were renter-occupied. The homeowner vacancy rate was 2.1% and the rental vacancy rate was 3.8%.

Racial composition as of the 2020 census
Race	Number	Percent
White	3,522	78.7%
Black or African American	51	1.1%
American Indian and Alaska Native	48	1.1%
Asian	65	1.5%
Native Hawaiian and Other Pacific Islander	6	0.1%
Some other race	235	5.3%
Two or more races	548	12.2%
Hispanic or Latino (of any race)	713	15.9%

=== 2010 census ===
As of the 2010 census, there were 4,538 people, 2,001 households, and 1,178 families living in the city. The population density was 3,151.4 inhabitants per square mile (1,216.8/km^{2}). There were 2,149 housing units at an average density of 1,492.4 per square mile (576.2/km^{2}). The racial makeup of the city was 84.0% White, 0.9% African American, 1.5% Native American, 1.3% Asian, 0.2% Pacific Islander, 7.9% from other races, and 4.3% from two or more races. Hispanic or Latino of any race were 15.8% of the population.

There were 2,001 households, of which 24.3% had children under the age of 18 living with them, 42.7% were married couples living together, 10.6% had a female householder with no husband present, 5.5% had a male householder with no wife present, and 41.1% were non-families. 33.1% of all households were made up of individuals, and 16.9% had someone living alone who was 65 years of age or older. The average household size was 2.26 and the average family size was 2.87.

The median age in the city was 44 years. 20.7% of residents were under the age of 18; 7.5% were between the ages of 18 and 24; 22.8% were from 25 to 44; 26.9% were from 45 to 64; and 22% were 65 years of age or older. The gender makeup of the city was 46.9% male and 53.1% female.

=== 2000 census ===
As of the 2000 census, there were 4,060 people, 1,746 households, and 1,117 families living in the city. The population density was 3,249.8 inhabitants per square mile (1,254.8/km^{2}). There were 1,850 housing units at an average density of 1,480.8 per square mile (571.7/km^{2}). The racial makeup of the city was 89.95% White, 0.86% African American, 1.08% Native American, 0.67% Asian, 0.17% Pacific Islander, 4.51% from other races, and 2.76% from two or more races. Hispanic or Latino of any race were 8.89% of the population.

There were 1,746 households, out of which 28.5% had children under the age of 18 living with them, 49.6% were married couples living together, 11.1% had a female householder with no husband present, and 36.0% were non-families. 29.3% of all households were made up of individuals, and 14.9% had someone living alone who was 65 years of age or older. The average household size was 2.32 and the average family size was 2.84.

In the city, the population was spread out, with 23.2% under the age of 18, 7.5% from 18 to 24, 24.7% from 25 to 44, 23.5% from 45 to 64, and 21.1% who were 65 years of age or older. The median age was 41 years. For every 100 females, there were 90.1 males. For every 100 females age 18 and over, there were 84.0 males.

The median income for a household in the city was $31,701, and the median income for a family was $38,176. Males had a median income of $29,832 versus $23,719 for females. The per capita income for the city was $16,828. About 8.6% of families and 11.6% of the population were below the poverty line, including 19.3% of those under age 18 and 4.3% of those age 65 or over.

== Education ==
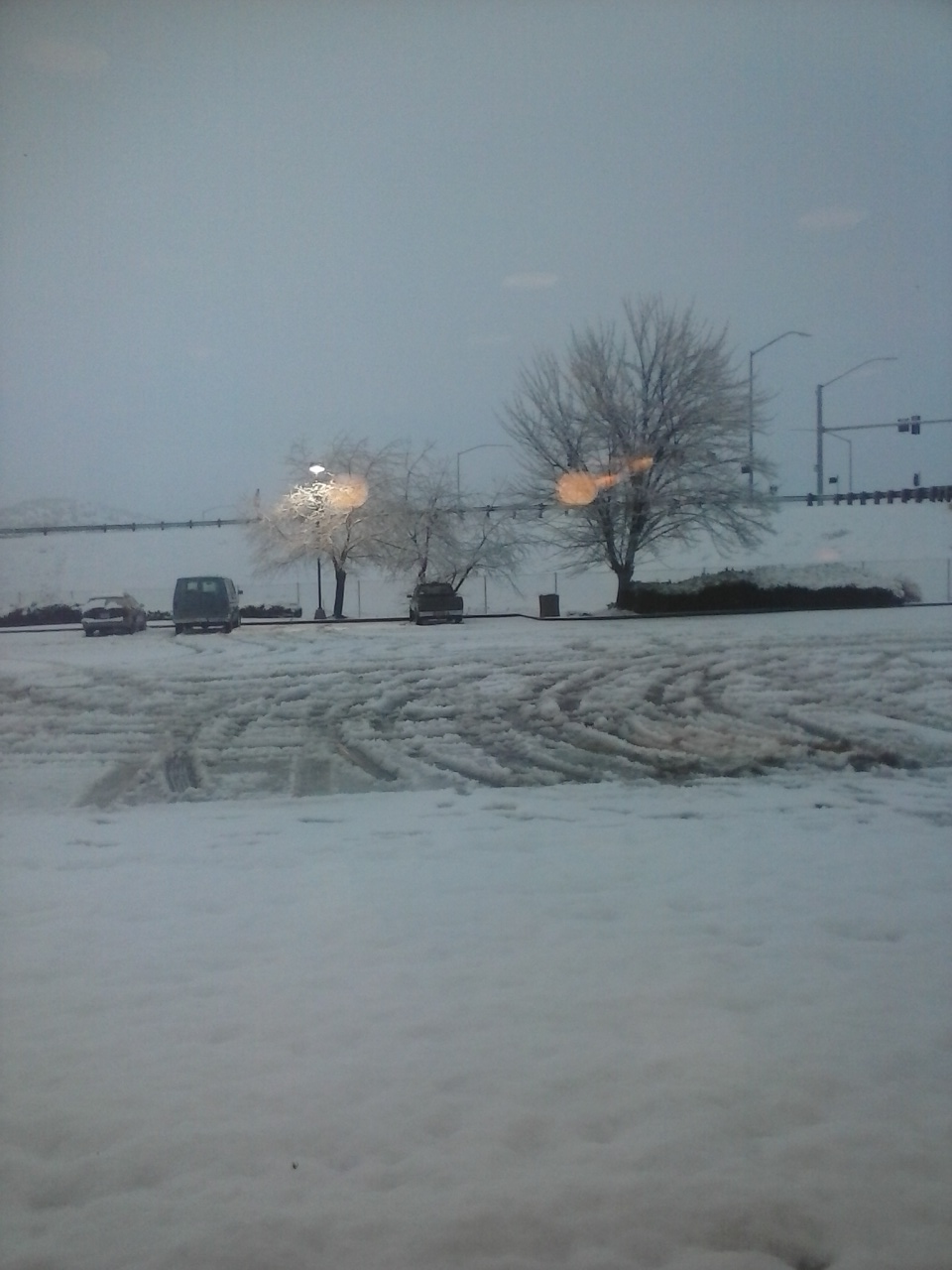
Snow in Phoenix

Phoenix is part of the Phoenix-Talent School District. The city is the site of two of the five schools in the district—Phoenix Elementary School and Phoenix High School, as well as Armadillo Technical Institute, a public charter school.

== Notable people ==
- Dennis W. Day, actor and original Mickey Mouse Club (1955–57) cast member.
- Tami Farrell, Miss Oregon Teen USA 2003, Miss Teen USA 2003, Miss California USA 2009
- Bill Pearl, world champion bodybuilder

== In popular culture ==
An independent film titled Phoenix, Oregon was produced in 2018 and revolves around two characters who live in the city. Despite this, the film was actually shot in Klamath Falls, Oregon. During the COVID-19 pandemic, most US movie theaters were closed. The film was re-released in theaters in smaller cities that remained opened. Because of this, Phoenix, Oregon was the highest grossing film at the US box office for three weeks in March and April 2020. Its biggest weekend was April 10–12, 2020, when it earned more than $11,000 at the box office.
