= Phoenix-Talent School District =

School district in Oregon, United States

Address
- 401 West 4th Street Phoenix, Oregon, 97535; United States

District information
- Type: Public
- Grades: PreK–12
- NCES District ID: 4109630

Students and staff
- Students: 2,402 (2020–2021)
- Teachers: 129.36 (on an FTE basis)
- Staff: 132.76 (on an FTE basis)
- Student–teacher ratio: 18.57:1

Other information
- Website: www.phoenix.k12.or.us

The Phoenix-Talent School District #4 is a public school district in the U.S. state of Oregon. It serves the cities of Phoenix, Talent and parts of Medford. There are three elementary schools in the district: Phoenix Elementary, Talent Elementary, and Orchard Hill Elementary. The one middle school is Talent Middle School and the one high school is Phoenix High School. District enrollment in grades K–12 stood at 2,800 students as of 2010.

== Demographics ==
In the 2009 school year, the district had 47 students classified as homeless by the Department of Education, or 1.7% of students in the district.
