= Samuel Colver =

American pioneer (1817–1891)

- Samuel Colver
- Born: September 10, 1817 (Note: There seems to be a dispute over whether Colver was born in 1815 or 1817. Most sources list the former as his year of birth, but his grave marker lists the latter; because of this, we are choosing to go by the date on his grave marker (September 10, 1817), as it is likely more accurate.); Irwin, Ohio, U.S.
- Died: February 15, 1891 (aged 73); Klamath County, Oregon, U.S.
- Resting place: Phoenix Pioneer Cemetery, Phoenix, Oregon
- Occupation(s): Lawyer, United States Marshal
- Spouse: Huldah Callender (m. 1843)
- Children: 2 (possibly 3)

Samuel Colver (September 10, 1817 – February 15, 1891) was a pioneer of the U.S. state of Oregon, where he co-founded (along with his brother, Hiram) the town of Phoenix. Samuel was born in Irwin, Ohio, to Samuel Colver and Rachel (Curry) Colver.

== Biography ==
Early in life he studied law at Plymouth College in Indiana. Afterward, he served as a Texas Ranger and served with General Sam Houston at the Battle of San Jacinto, and later served as an Indian scout.

=== Career ===
In 1850, he and his brother Hiram moved their families to Oregon via the Oregon Trail, beginning their migration from St. Joseph, Buchanan County, Missouri. Samuel and Hiram founded the small community of Phoenix, initially called Gasburg, settling on donation land claims.

Samuel constructed a home in Phoenix in 1855–1856. During Colver's life, in addition to a residence, "Colver Hall" served as a school, a dance hall, a public meeting place, and a refuge during the Rogue River Indian Wars, though it is doubtful if the house ever actually was under attack. The Samuel and Huldah Colver House was listed on the National Register of Historic Places in 1990. When it was destroyed by fire in September 2008, it was one of the oldest residences in Jackson County. The remaining three walls of the house were razed after the fire and the property was removed from the National Register in April 2009.

Colver served as a U.S. Marshal. He was instrumental in the founding of the Republican Party in Oregon, supporting Lincoln, and occasionally wrote poetry that was published in several Oregon newspapers.

Samuel Colver was married to Huldah Callender on December 5, 1843, in Logan County, Ohio. Huldah was born near Mechanicsburg, Ohio on January 1, 1823. Samuel and Huldah were the parents of two children, Lewellyn, born March 28, 1847, in Irwin, Union County, Ohio, and Isabelle, who was born in a covered wagon on February 7, 1850, near St. Joseph, Buchanan County, Missouri. Lewellyn was killed on March 9, 1884, by a neighbor who shot him after mistakenly believing he was a burglar. Samuel's daughter Isabelle died of diphtheria on April 12, 1885, in Phoenix, Jackson County, Oregon. Grief-stricken over the loss of both of his children, Samuel Colver was confined for a month to the Oregon State Insane Asylum in Salem. A third child is suspected to have been born to Samuel and Huldah, named Alice Colver, but she died in infancy in Ohio.

Samuel died somewhat mysteriously in February 1891. He was found drowned near Upper Klamath Lake after riding out alone. He was known to have some enemies and there was rumor of land swindles, but nothing was ever proven.

Samuel Colver has been very often confused with Samuel Henry Culver in numerous articles concerning the life of Samuel Colver. Both Samuels were residing in Southern Oregon during the early 1850s. The result has been that articles regularly attribute Samuel Colver as serving as an Indian Agent in Southern Oregon when it was actually Samuel Henry Culver who served as Indian Agent in Southern Oregon.
