= Beeson, West Virginia =

Unincorporated community in West Virginia, United States

- Unincorporated community
- Location within the state of West Virginia Beeson, West Virginia (the United States)
- Coordinates: 37°28′15″N 81°11′38″W
- Country: United States
- State: West Virginia
- County: Mercer
- Elevation: 2,349 ft (716 m)
- Time zone: UTC-5 (Eastern (EST))
  - Summer (DST): UTC-4 (EDT)
- ZIP code: 24714
- Area codes: 304 & 681
- GNIS feature ID: 1553842

Beeson is an unincorporated community in Mercer County, West Virginia, United States. Beeson is 8.5 miles (13.7 km) northwest of Princeton. Beeson had a post office, which closed on January 28, 2006.
