= Emigrant Creek =

Stream in Oregon, U.S.

Coordinates: 42°11′40″N 122°39′52″W

Emigrant Creek is a stream in the U.S. state of Oregon. It is a tributary to Bear Creek.

Emigrant Creek was named in 1846 by a party of emigrants which crossed over it.
