= Ronald Beeson =

English cricketer

Ronald Neave Beeson (23 October 1936 – 8 August 1995) was an English cricketer. He was a right-handed batsman and wicket-keeper who captained Lincolnshire County Cricket Club.

Beeson was born and died in Grimsby.

Beeson played club cricket for Cleethorpes Cricket Club and Grimsby Town Cricket Club. He also represented Lincolnshire in 87 Minor Counties Championship matches between 1957 and 1966, as county captain from 1962. He also made two List A appearances for the side in the Gillette Cup.
