= John Beeson =

American activist (1803–1889)

- Born: September 18, 1803; Nottinghamshire, England
- Died: 1889 (aged 85–86); Talent, Oregon
- Occupations: Abolitionist, Native American advocate
- Notable work: A Plea for the Indians
- Children: 1

John Beeson (1803 – 1889) was a British-American abolitionist and early Native American advocate. He authored A Plea for the Indians in 1857.

== Background ==
Beeson was born in Nottinghamshire, England on September 18, 1803. He emigrated to the United States in 1830 and settled in Ithaca, New York. In 1833, he moved to a farm in La Salle County Illinois, just southwest of the town of Ottawa, Illinois. His farm was a station on the Underground Railroad. In 1853, he relocated to southern Oregon with his wife and son, settling in Talent, Oregon.

During the Rogue River Wars, Beeson was an outspoken advocate for the Indians. In 1855 he ran for the Oregon Territorial Legislature as likely the first Republican candidate in the Oregon Territory. He campaigned against slavery and championed the rights of Black and Indigenous people. Unsurprisingly garnered a tiny fraction of the votes. Beeson was eventually forced to leave town on May 23, 1856.

Beeson did not return to Oregon for nearly a decade, and published A Plea for the Indians. He traveled extensively throughout the eastern United States, giving lectures and advocating Indian rights. After the American Civil War, Beeson traveled to Portland, Oregon before his death near Wagner Creek in Talent, Oregon.
