= Mass fatality incident =

Concept in emergency management

A mass fatality incident is an emergency management term used to identify an incident involving more dead bodies and/or body parts than can be located, identified, and processed for final disposition by available response resources.

Although it is a somewhat relative term in that there is no widely accepted number of fatalities that define a mass fatality incident, it is generally recognized that if the number of fatalities exceeds the local city or county's resource capabilities causing them to request assistance, or mutual aid, from neighboring jurisdictions, the term applies.

Mass fatality incidents may or may not be a result of a mass casualty incident, which is considered a different type of incident and usually focuses more on managing the surviving victims of an incident. Mass fatality and mass casualty incidents may, and often do, occur simultaneously. Mass fatality incidents, differ from mass casualty incidents in that most, if not all, of the victims of the incident are deceased. A catastrophic plane crash with no survivors is an example of a mass fatality incident. Part of the distinction is because different kinds of resources are needed to manage each. Living victims are attended to by medical personnel such as Emergency Medical Services, deceased victims are attended to by medical examiners or coroners.

Mass fatality incidents may be either caused by humans, such as hazardous materials releases, transportation accidents, military or terrorist attacks, or they may be the result of natural disasters such as earthquakes, floods, or severe weather.

== Examples ==
Some significant mass fatality incidents are:

- The 2004 Indian Ocean tsunami
- The atomic bombings of Hiroshima and Nagasaki
- Hurricane Katrina
- The September 11 attacks
- The Oklahoma City bombing
- The Bhopal Disaster
- The Spanish flu pandemic
- The 2020 Beirut explosions
- The COVID-19 pandemic
- Forensic Identification of the October 7 victims

One of the naturally occurring incidents with great potential to cause a mass fatality incident is pandemic influenza (flu). The Spanish flu pandemic of 1918 killed millions and overwhelmed response resources on a global level. A modern pandemic could have similarly overwhelming impacts. Catastrophic incidents that result in mass fatalities usually also result in mass injuries and/or illnesses. While it is more important to dedicate resources to care for the living, many people have public health concerns about the dead. This is one important reason why jurisdictions usually include mass fatality planning as part of their overall emergency preparedness efforts.

== Response functions ==
The primary response functions in a mass fatality incident are:

1. Human remains recovery - the search & rescue efforts to locate bodies and body parts, marking and documenting the location of found remains, and eventually transporting the remains to either decontamination or the site morgue for examination as appropriate.
2. Decontamination (depending on event) - the "cleaning" of either chemically or biologically contaminated remains to make them safe for further handling and examination.
3. Examination
4. Identification & death certification - see disaster victim identification
5. Processing for final disposition

After some mass fatality incidents, authorities have conducted hasty mass burials, and research has shown this is a generally unsatisfactory response. Mass burials are usually not required for public health reasons, they increase distress among survivors and interfere with long-term community recovery. In all cultures there are customs and rituals for dealing with the dead. Universally survivors want to know what happened to their loved ones, and that their loved ones' remains were treated with respect. These are important reasons to plan for mass fatality management.

== Management resources ==
The Disaster Mortuary Operational Response Team (DMORT) is part of the National Disaster Medical System and provides support to the National Transportation Safety Board and other mass fatality requirements.

== See also ==
- Emergency management
