= Bear Creek (Rogue River tributary) =

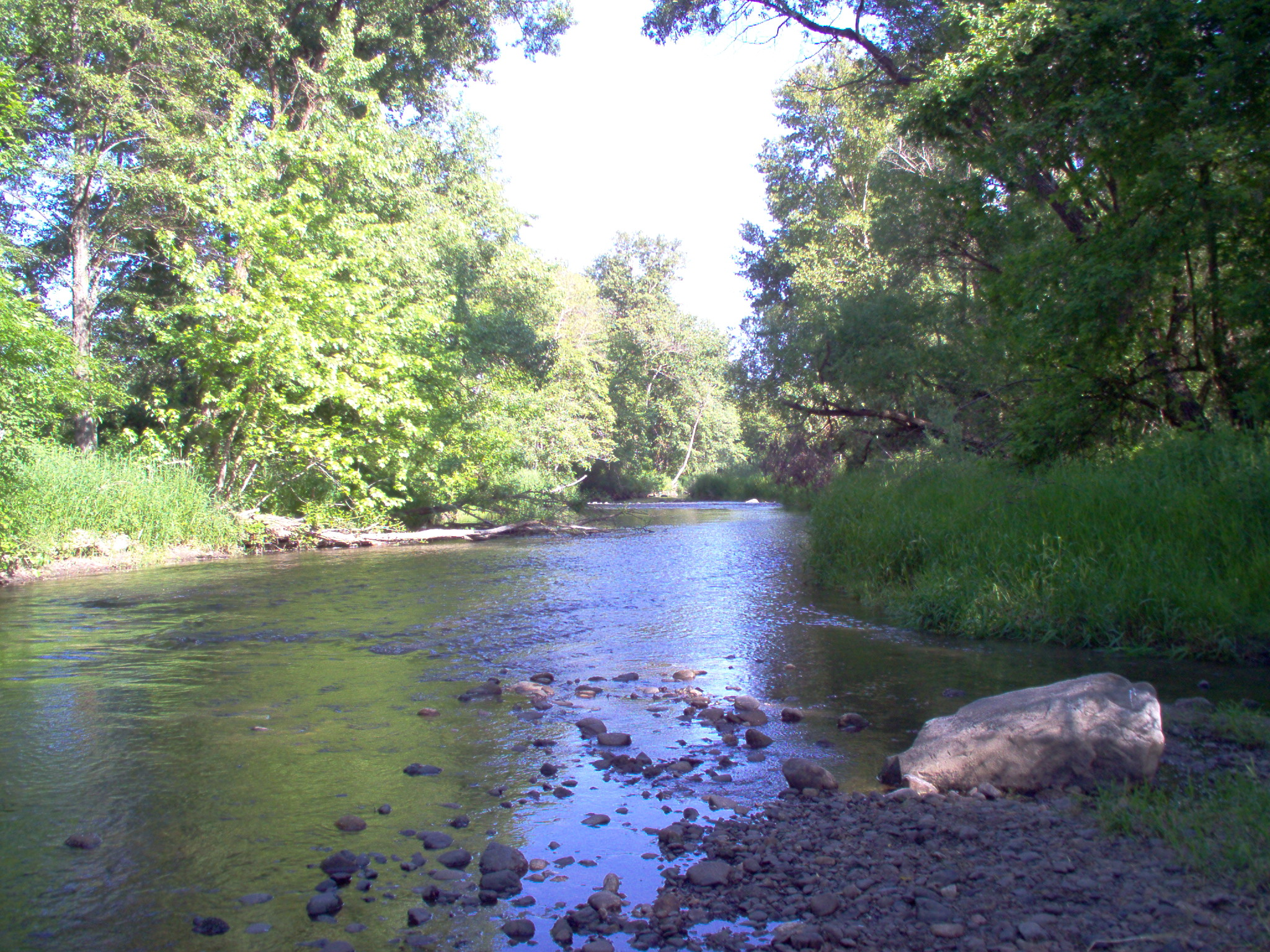
- Bear Creek in Medford, Oregon

- Location of the mouth of Bear Creek in Oregon

Location
- Country: United States
- State: Oregon
- County: Jackson

Physical characteristics
- Source
  - location: Near Emigrant Lake
  - coordinates: 42°11′40″N 122°39′52″W
  - elevation: 1,842 ft (561 m) (Note: Source elevation derived by averaging the Geographic Names Information System's mouth elevations for Emigrant and Neil creeks.)
- Mouth: Rogue River
  - location: Central Point
  - coordinates: 42°25′56″N 122°58′13″W
  - elevation: 1,168 ft (356 m)
- Length: 28.80 mi (46.35 km)
- Basin size: 361 sq mi (930 km^{2})
- Discharge
  - location: Medford, Oregon
  - average: 114 cu ft/s (3.2 m^{3}/s)
  - minimum: 0.2 cu ft/s (0.0057 m^{3}/s)
  - maximum: 10,900 cu ft/s (310 m^{3}/s)

Bear Creek is the name of a stream located entirely within the Jackson County, Oregon, United States. The stream drains approximately 400 square miles (1,000 km^{2}) of the Rogue Valley and discharges an annual average of 114 cubic feet per second (3.2 m^{3}/s) into the Rogue River. It begins near Emigrant Lake and travels 28.8 miles (46.3 km) through the municipalities of Ashland, Talent, Phoenix, Medford, and Central Point.

== History ==
Prior to the arrival of settlers in the 1850s, the Bear Creek Valley was home to three Indian tribes; these were the Takelmas, the Latgawas, and the Shastas. The scattered camps hunted deer and elk, fished for salmon, raided other tribes, and consumed plums, sunflowers, and root crops. When the area was originally settled, the stream was called Si-ku-ptat by the natives and may have been known as Stewart River by settlers.

Various forced migrations occurred during the 1850s in which almost all of the Native American inhabitants were displaced to Indian Reservations to stop their raids. This was completed by 1857. Farmers and ranchers continued to acquire land claims, and when the Oregon and California Railroad arrived in 1883, Bear Creek was chosen as the route to follow.

== Geology ==
The Bear Creek watershed is a curved valley (actually part of the Rogue Valley) averaging about 13 miles (21 km) wide and 28 miles (45 km) long, covering approximately 361 square miles (930 km^{2}). The confluence with the Rogue River is in the northwestern tip of the valley. The highest point in the watershed is on Mount Ashland at an elevation of about 7,500 feet (2,300 m). From there at least 83 streams in 21 sub-watersheds share a link with the greater Rogue River Basin.

The landscape surrounding the watershed has been carved by tectonic activity leaving steep canyons that are prone to flooding when snow melts in the spring. The slopes are part of the transition zone between volcanic soil and granitic soil covering much of Southern Oregon and Northern California and are prone to significant periods of erosion and runoff during high-flow periods. Furthermore, the elevation of the watershed at the point of confluence is about 1,075 feet (328 m), and a significant amount of kinetic energy builds up over the first 5,000 feet (1,500 m) of drop. Historically, the landscape plays a large part in dispersing this energy but flooding has become a regular problem along the Bear Creek; several earlier bridges in the Rogue Valley have been wiped out during random flood events.

== See also ==
- Bear Creek Greenway
