= Phoenix High School (Oregon) =

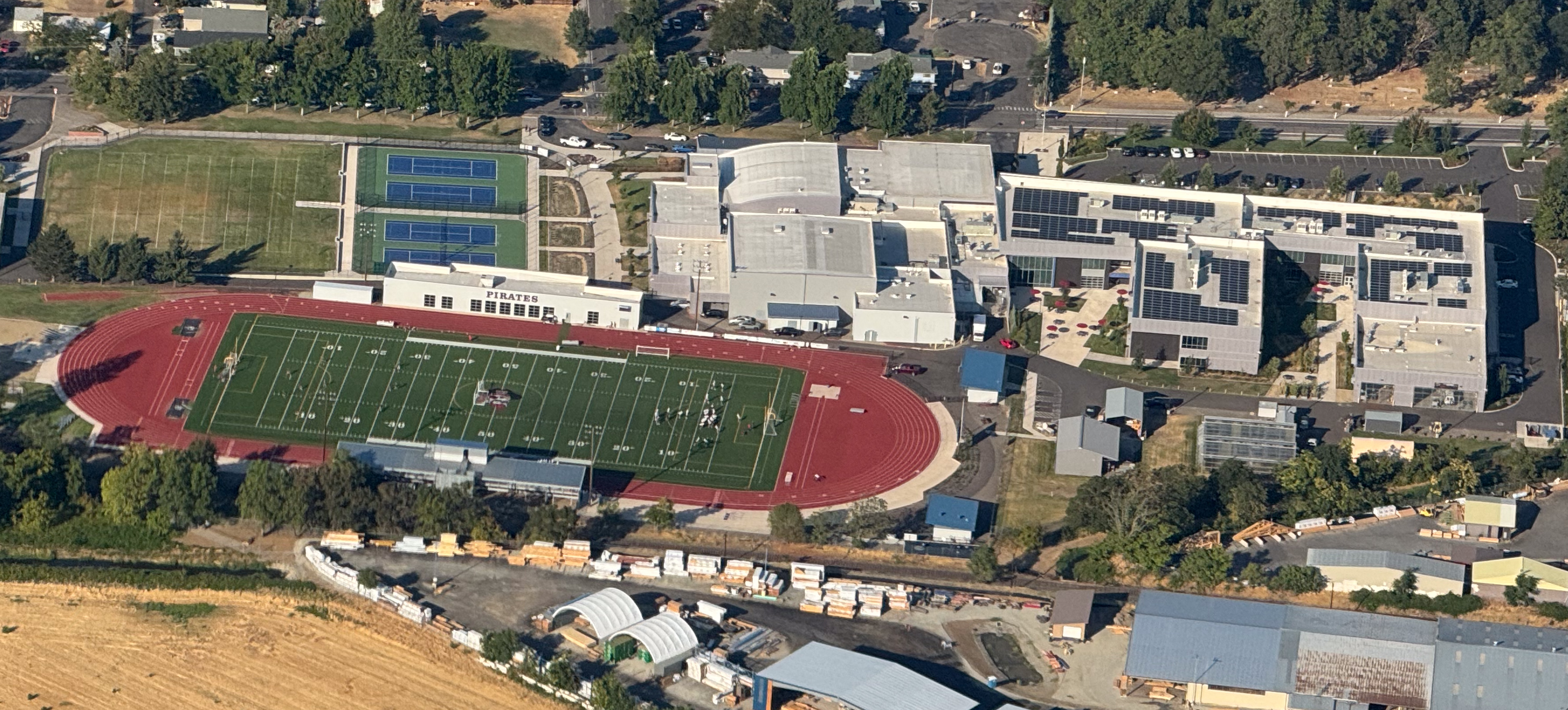
- Phoenix High School aerial view

Location
- 745 N Rose Street; Phoenix, Jackson County, Oregon 97535; United States; 42.277118°N 122.824547°W

Information
- Type: Public
- School district: Phoenix-Talent School District
- Principal: Kalin Cross
- Teaching staff: 34.00 (FTE)
- Grades: 9-12
- Enrollment: 676 (2023–2024)
- Student to teacher ratio: 19.88
- Colors: Navy, white, red
- Athletics conference: OSAA Skyline Conference 4A-6
- Team name: Pirates
- Newspaper: The Pirate Scroll
- Website: Phoenix HS website

Phoenix High School is a public high school in Phoenix, Oregon, United States.

== Academics ==
In 2018, Phoenix High School was ranked #20 in U.S. News & World Report's ranking of Oregon high schools. Nationally, it was ranked #2444. As of May 2018, there were 766 students enrolled at Phoenix High School and of those enrolled students, 39% were minorities and 56% come from disenfranchised backgrounds.
