= Japanese Garden (Ashland, Oregon) =

Garden in Ashland, Oregon, U.S.

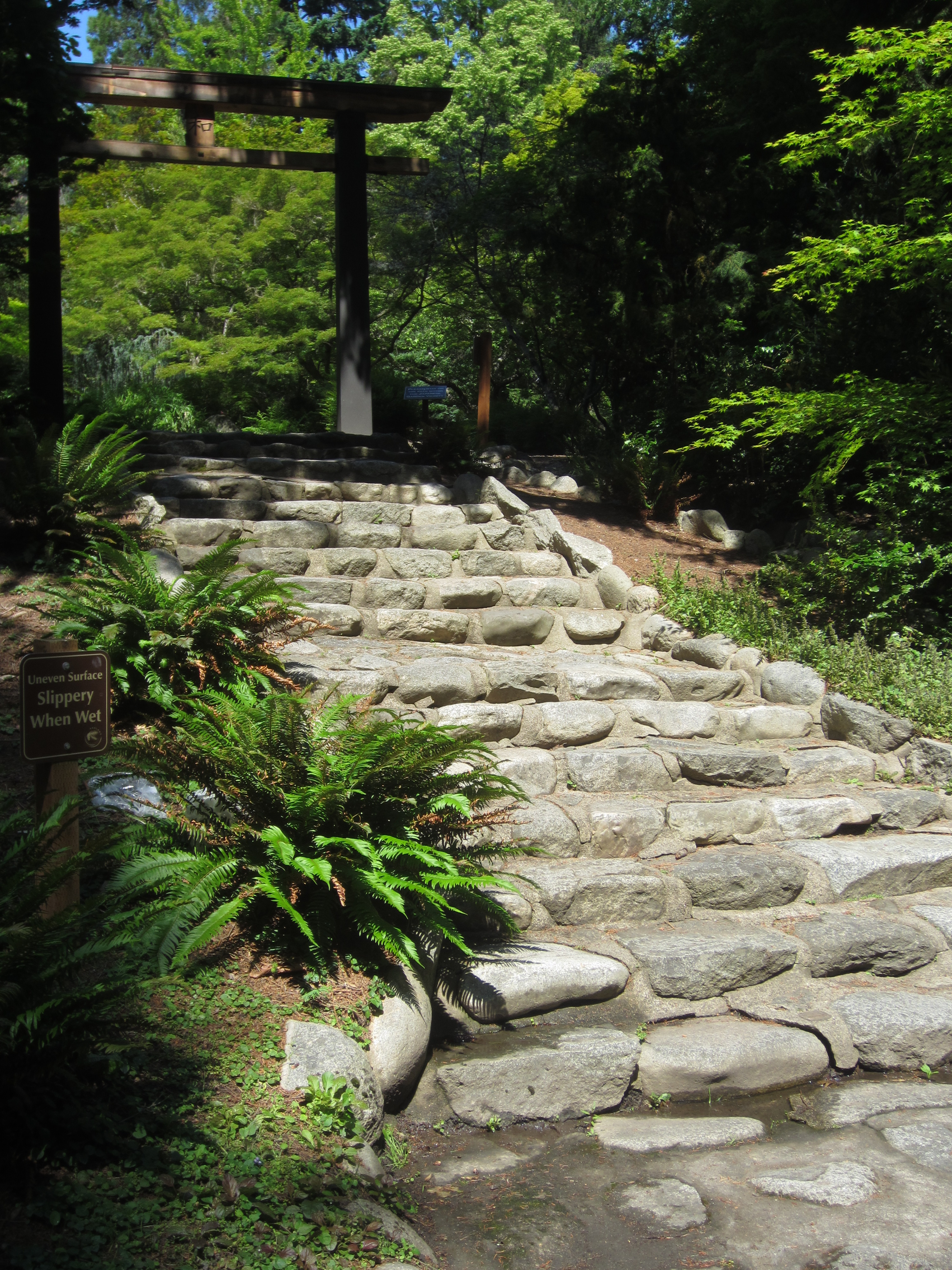
- Steps leading up to the garden, 2019

- Location within Oregon
- Nearest city: Ashland, Oregon, United States
- Coordinates: 42°11′30″N 122°43′8″W
- Area: .5 acres (0.20 ha)
- Opened: 1915
- Designer: John McLaren

The Japanese Garden is part of Ashland, Oregon's Lithia Park, in the United States.

== Description and history ==
The .5-acre (0.20 ha) garden was designed by landscape architect John McLaren in 1915. In 2018, a $1.3 million grant was intended to improve the garden's authenticity. The garden's redesign was put on hold in January 2019, following criticism over the potential removal of two century-old Douglas firs planted by Boy Scouts.

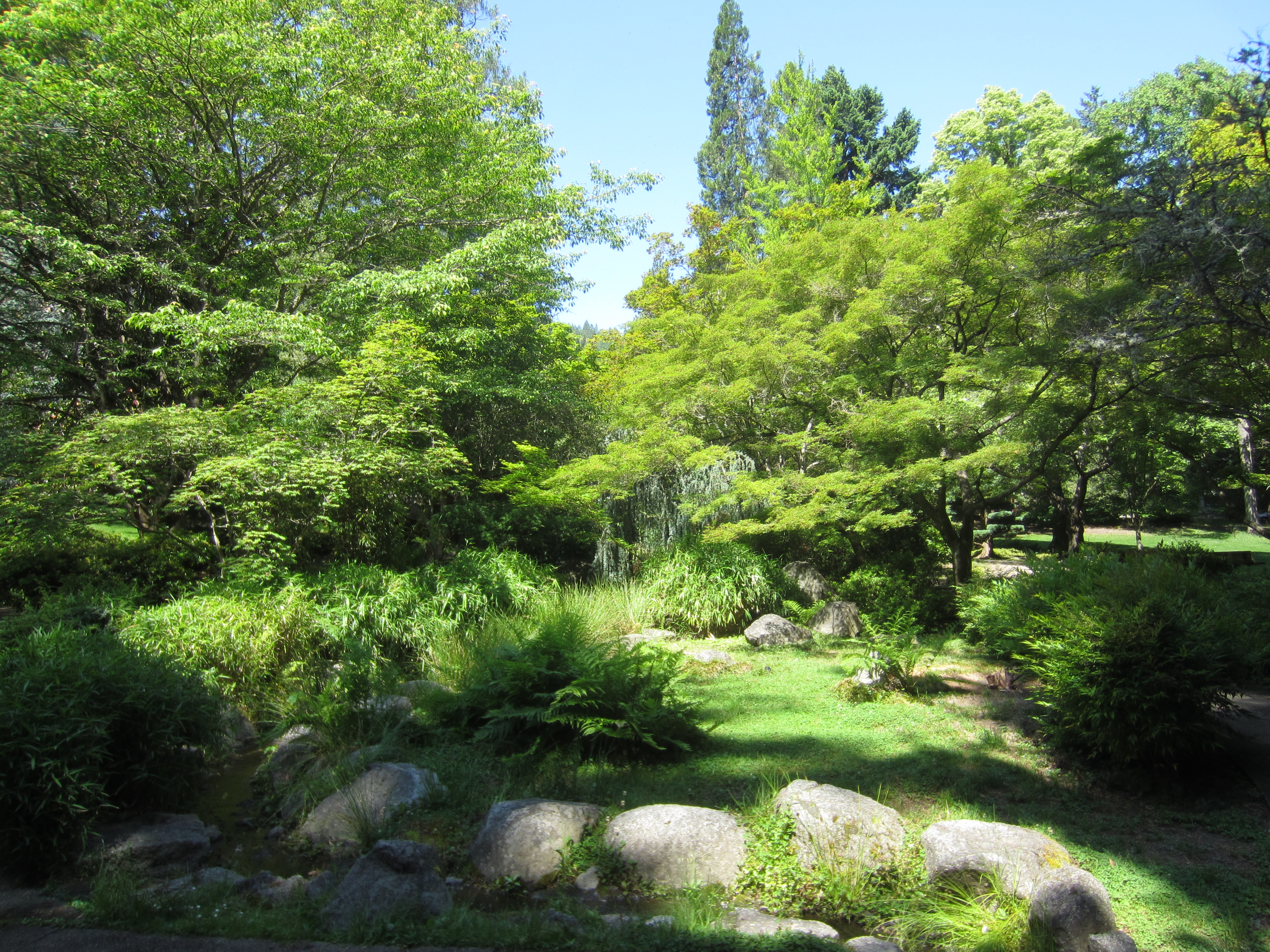

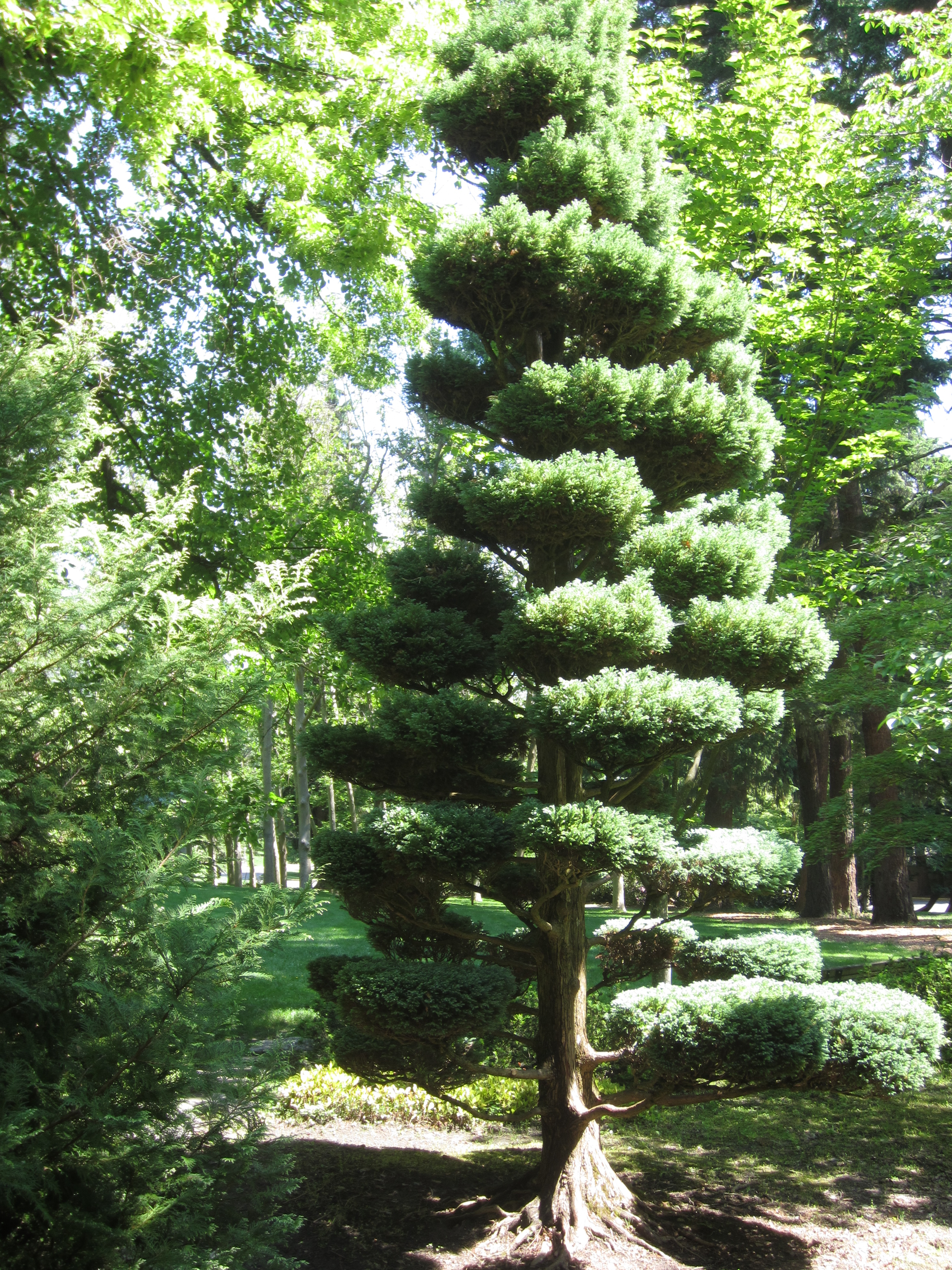

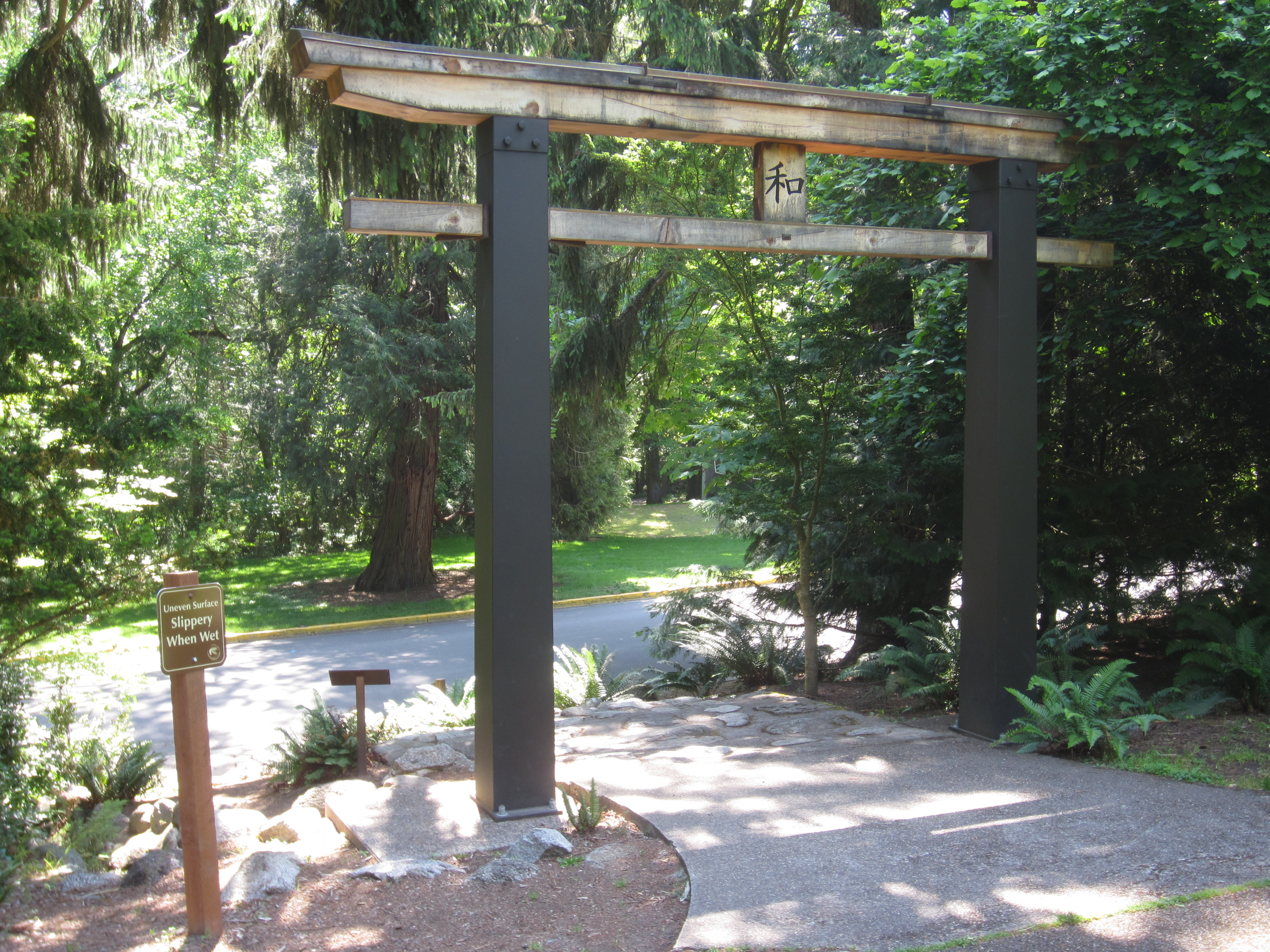
