= Abel Helman =

American pioneer (1824–1910)

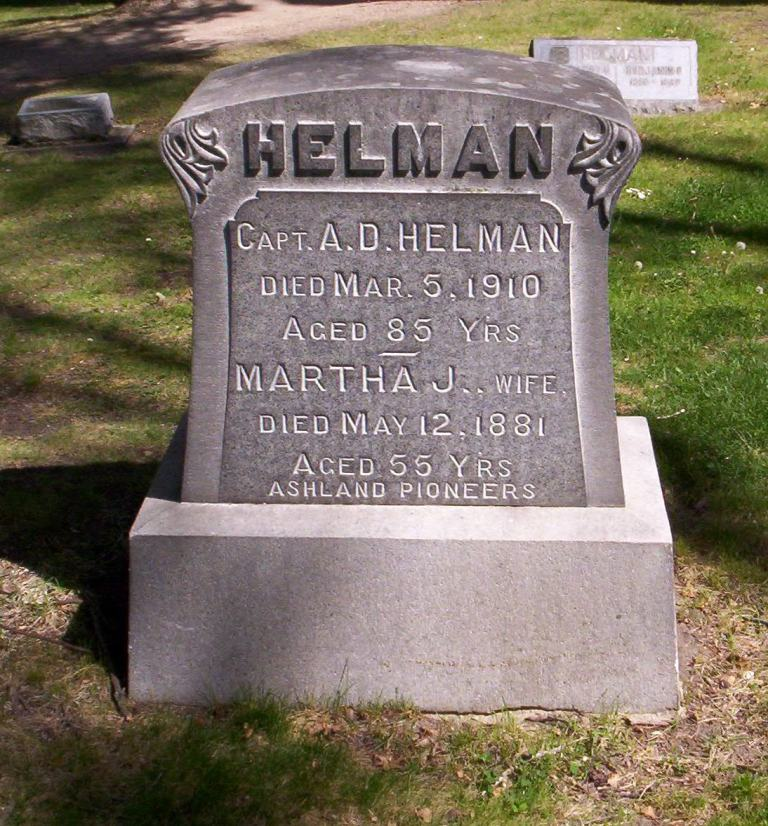
Abel Helman's tombstone in Ashland Cemetery, Ashland, Oregon

Abel D. Helman (April 10, 1824 – March 5, 1910) was an American pioneer of Ashland, Oregon.

== Early life ==
Helman was born in Wayne, Ashland County, Ohio on April 10, 1824. Of German descent, he was the fourth of seven children. His youth was divided between work on the farm and education through a subscription school, which was common to that period. On October 23, 1849, he married Martha Jane Kanagy, with whom he had eight children. Helman learned the carpenter's trade in Wooster, Ohio, and worked in cabinet-making until he was twenty-six years old.

== Move to Oregon ==
News of the mid-century gold finds in California made its way East from time to time, fueling Helman's desire to make his own fortune. In January 1850, he sailed for California via Aspinwall, today's Colón, Panama, as a passenger on the steamer Ohio.

In April 1850, he arrived in San Francisco, where he made his way to Beaver Creek, California, and eventually on to Sacramento. In 1851, he drove a mule team from Yreka over the mountains to the Willamette Valley of Oregon, arriving in Salem. While en route he crossed a part of the tract of land that he afterwards took up through the Donation Land Claim Act, and upon which a large portion of Ashland, Oregon now sits.

He returned to California, and made his home at Yreka until January 1852, when he came to Jackson County, Oregon, with several others, all of whom secured donation land claims. After making preparations for having a home there he returned to Ohio for his wife and children.

== In Ashland ==
Ashland, named after their old home county in Ohio, became their permanent place of residence. From that time on, Helman was closely associated with the community's growth and its surrounding development.

The boundaries of his farm extended north and south along what is now First Avenue above the Chautauqua grove and west on what is now Nutley Street, then north through what is now the old North School grounds almost to Bear Creek. As the town developed, he sold off much of his original tract, but at the time of his death was still occupying about 10 acres (40,000 m^{2}) of the northern part of the claim.

As Ashland grew Helman joined with other settlers in many works of public improvement. They built the first sawmill on the banks of Ashland Creek, and the first flour mill which occupied a site near the center of the city that is now Lithia Park. They were forced to endure many hardships and privations incident to pioneer life and in the early days faced constant danger of Indian attack.

== Associations ==
Helman was a member of numerous fraternal orders and similar associations. He ranked high in the Independent Order of Odd Fellows (I.O.O.F.), having a wide acquaintance among the order throughout the state. He was one of the first members of Ashland Lodge, No. 45, I.O.O.F., and for many years served as one of its officers, filling every position in the subordinate lodge. In 1892, he was grand master of the grand lodge of Oregon. He became a member and past patriarch of the Pilot Rock encampment and he was also grand patriarch of the grand encampment of Oregon. For two years he was grand representative from Oregon to the sovereign grand lodge sessions and he was also prominent in the International Association of Rebekah Assemblies, the auxiliary organization to Independent Order of Odd Fellows.

== Legacy ==
Helman died on March 5, 1910, at the age of 85, and was interred with the honors of the Rebekah Lodge.

Helman Elementary school in Ashland, Oregon is named for him.

== Sources ==
The Centennial History of Oregon, 1811–1912, Vol. II: Biographical, Chicago, The S. J. Clarke Publishing Company, 1912, pp. 619–20.
