= Calle Guanajuato =

Park in Ashland, Oregon, U.S.

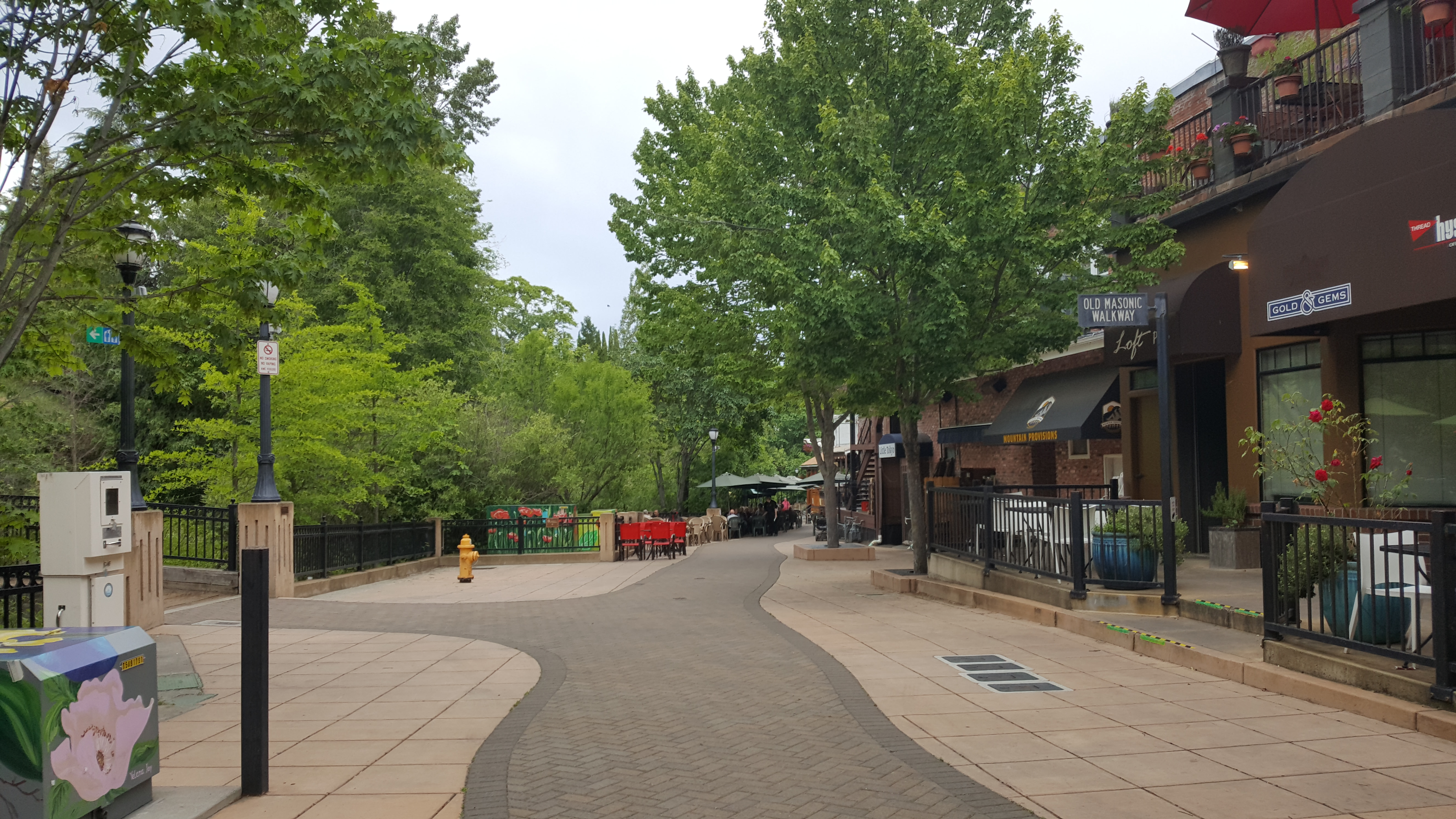
- Calle Guanajuato in 2019

- Location within Oregon
- Interactive map of Calle Guanajuato
- Type: Park
- Location: Ashland, Oregon
- Coordinates: 42°11′51″N 122°42′59″W

Calle Guanajuato is a park in Ashland, Oregon, United States.

== Description and features ==
The park follows part of Ashland Creek and has restaurants with outdoor seating.

The park has an approximately 52-foot-long mural.

In 2017, the Mail Tribune's Anita Burke said the park "[provides] the perfect convergence of creekside seating and restaurant variety".
