= Lithia Park =

Park in Ashland, Oregon, United States

- U.S. National Register of Historic Places
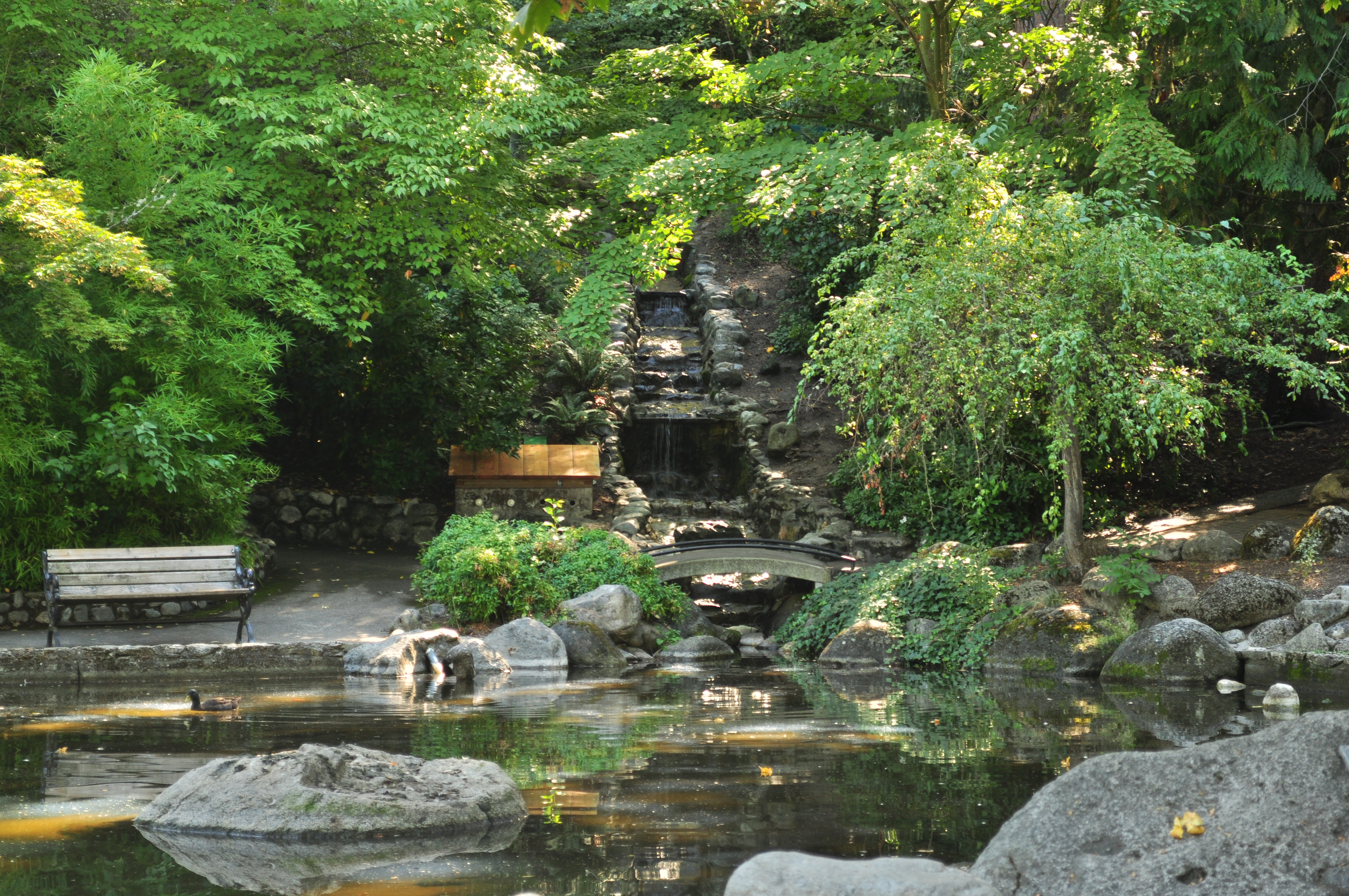
- Scenic area in the park.
- Location: Ashland, Jackson County, Oregon
- Coordinates: 42°11′24.1″N 122°43′1.1″W
- Area: 93 acres (38 ha)
- Built: 1892
- Website: Official website
- NRHP reference No.: 82001505
- Added to NRHP: November 22, 1982

Lithia Park is the largest and most central park of Ashland, Oregon, United States. It consists of 93 acres (38 hectares) of forested canyonland around Ashland Creek, stretching from the downtown plaza up toward its headwaters near Mount Ashland. Its name originates from lithium oxide (Li_{2}O) or "lithia," which is found in the stream water pumped to the park.

The park has two large greens, a bandshell for public musical performances, two duck ponds, a large playground, tennis courts, community buildings and, in winter, an ice skating rink. It also offers picnic areas and miles of hiking trails.

The park was listed on the National Register of Historic Places in 1982. It features a Japanese garden.

== History ==
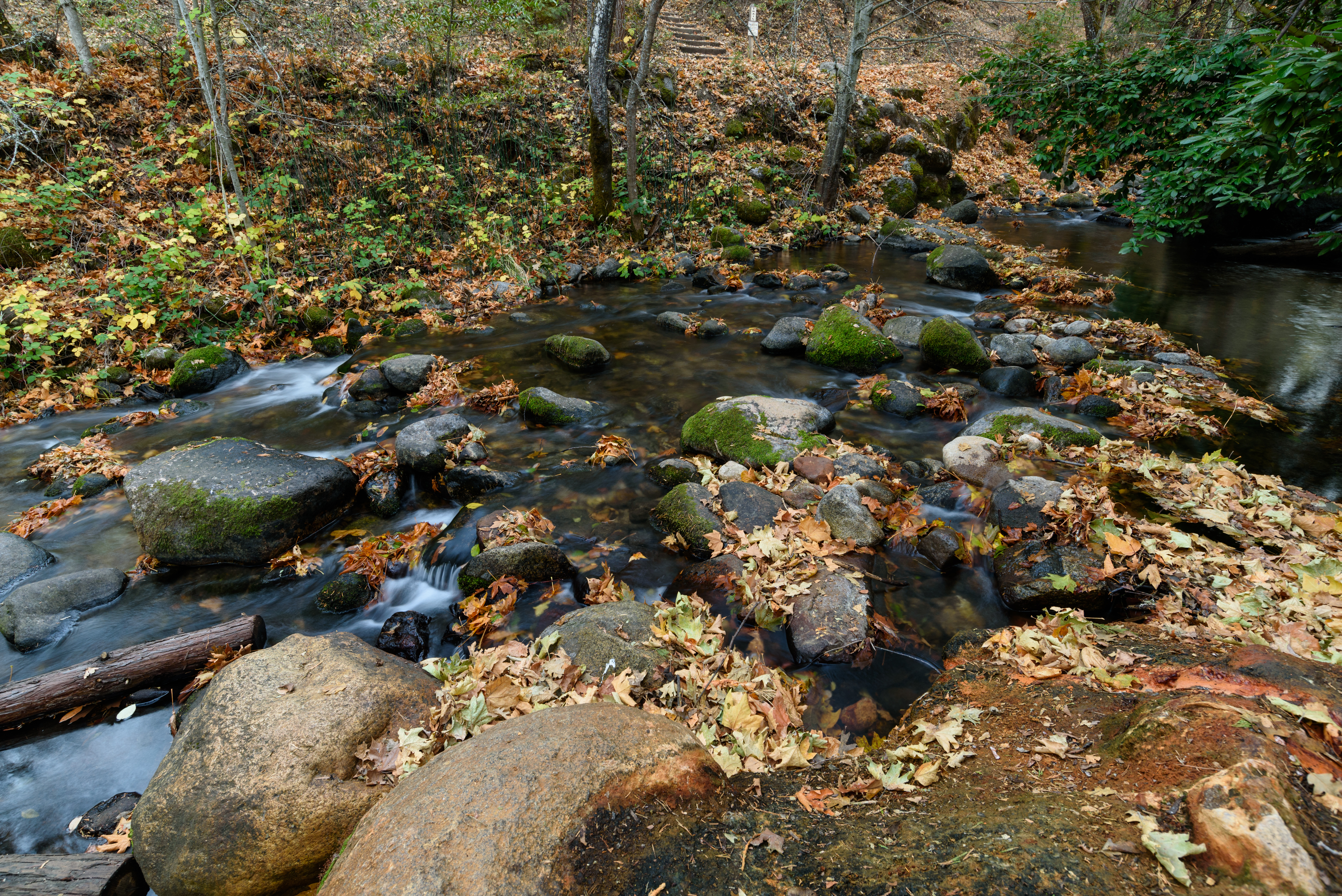
Ashland Creek

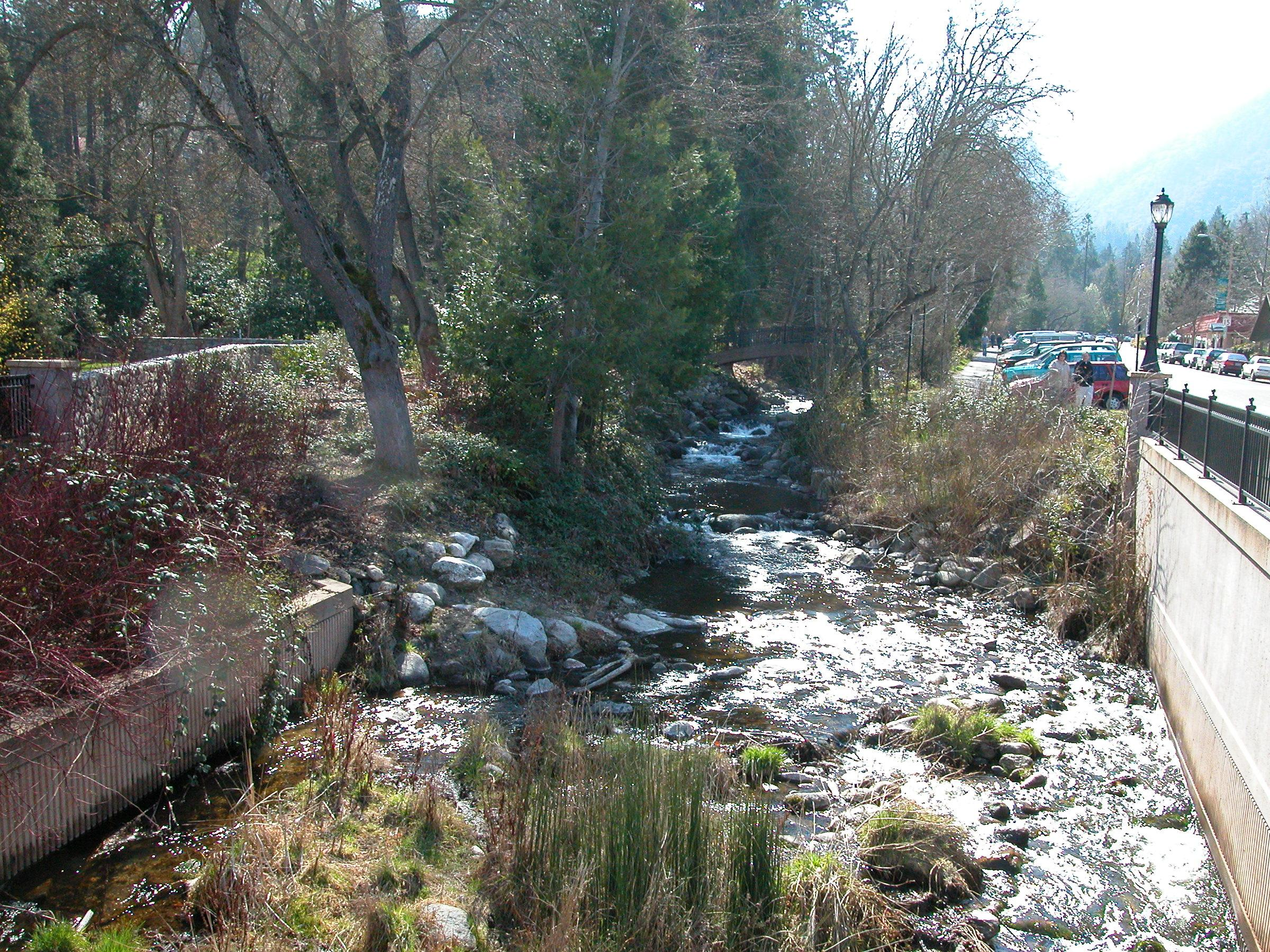
Winburn Way in Lithia Park

The area which now comprises the entrance to Lithia Park was the site of Abel Helman and Eber Emery's flour mill, the first building in what is now the city of Ashland—established in 1852. By the time the town (then called Ashland Mills) had grown up around the area, the old mill had become an eyesore, dirty with livestock and the mill all but abandoned.

The Chautauqua movement was very influential in Ashland, and many of the members of the Ladies Chautauqua Club formed the Women's Civic Improvement Club. Central to the focus of the club was the establishment of a park in Ashland. In 1908, after lobbying the city council, an amendment to the city charter was made establishing an elected park commission and setting aside all city-owned property bordering Ashland Creek for use as a park.

In 1907 a lithia water spring was discovered at Emigrant Creek several miles to the east. Upon analysis, the water was shown to have the second-highest concentration of (presumably beneficial) lithium in any natural spring (the highest being in the famous springs of Saratoga, New York). Bert Greer, a journalist, moved to Ashland in 1911 and purchased the Ashland Tidings newspaper. He agitated for the idea of establishing a mineral water resort at Ashland, and campaigned for a bond issue to fund mineral springs-related improvements to the park.

In 1914, the bond issue was passed, and the park commission engaged John McLaren, landscape architect of San Francisco's Golden Gate Park, to design improvements to the park. Additionally, Smith, Emery and Company were retained to do the necessary plumbing to pipe the "healthful" mineral waters into the park. During the ensuing period, much controversy arose over the spending of money and control of the park. The bond issue had placed authority in the hands of the Mineral Springs Commission (headed by Greer), and in 1916 Ashlanders voted to return control of the (now-named) Lithia Springs Park to the park commission.

During this period, in 1915, the park commission opened a free auto camp along the margins of the park, which remained popular, with several rounds of improvements to campsites and facilities, until closed.

Interest in a mineral springs resort faded (though was briefly revived in the 1920s). Plantings by the WPA under Chet Corry (appointed superintendent in 1937) improved the landscaping of the park entrance. Corry also implemented a new approach, bringing many native plants and landscaping features into the park.

During the next several years, the park commission expanded to establish many parks in Ashland; however, Lithia Park itself fell into disrepair. Financial and maintenance strains caused many features of the park to decay, and vandals destroyed several landmarks.

In 1974, a huge blow was dealt to the park when a devastating flood scoured much of the parkland. Ashlanders again voted for additional funding for the park, which went into repairing the storm damage as well as improvements and repairs. A subsequent flood, in early 1997, again damaged much of the park and the downtown Ashland Plaza area. Significant structural work on Ashland Creek and the parks bridges in the years following this flood helped to prevent further disaster and turned Lithia Park it into the centerpiece of the town that it is today.

The park was named by the American Planning Association as one of 10 Great Public Spaces in America in 2014.

== Gallery ==
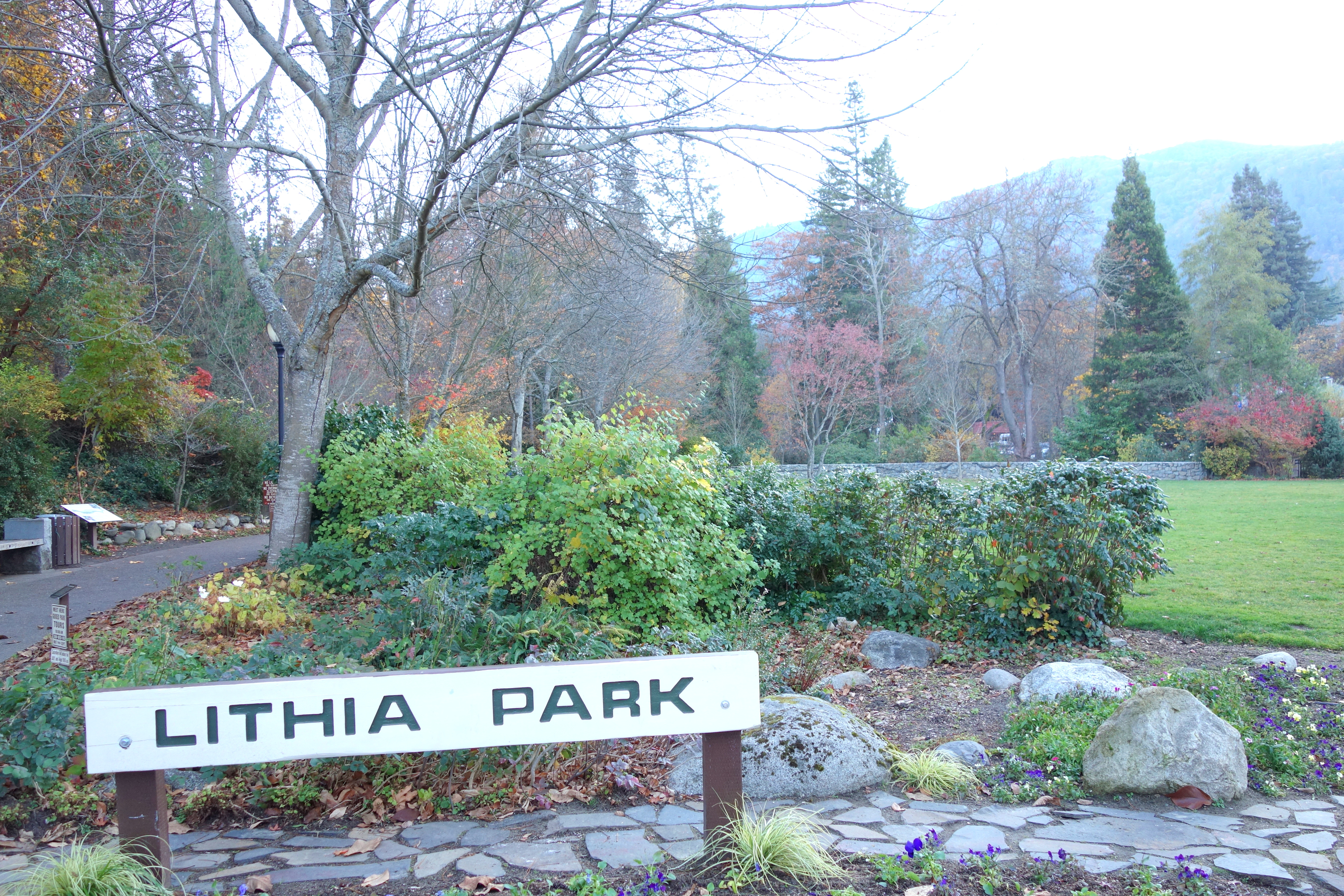
Entrance sign

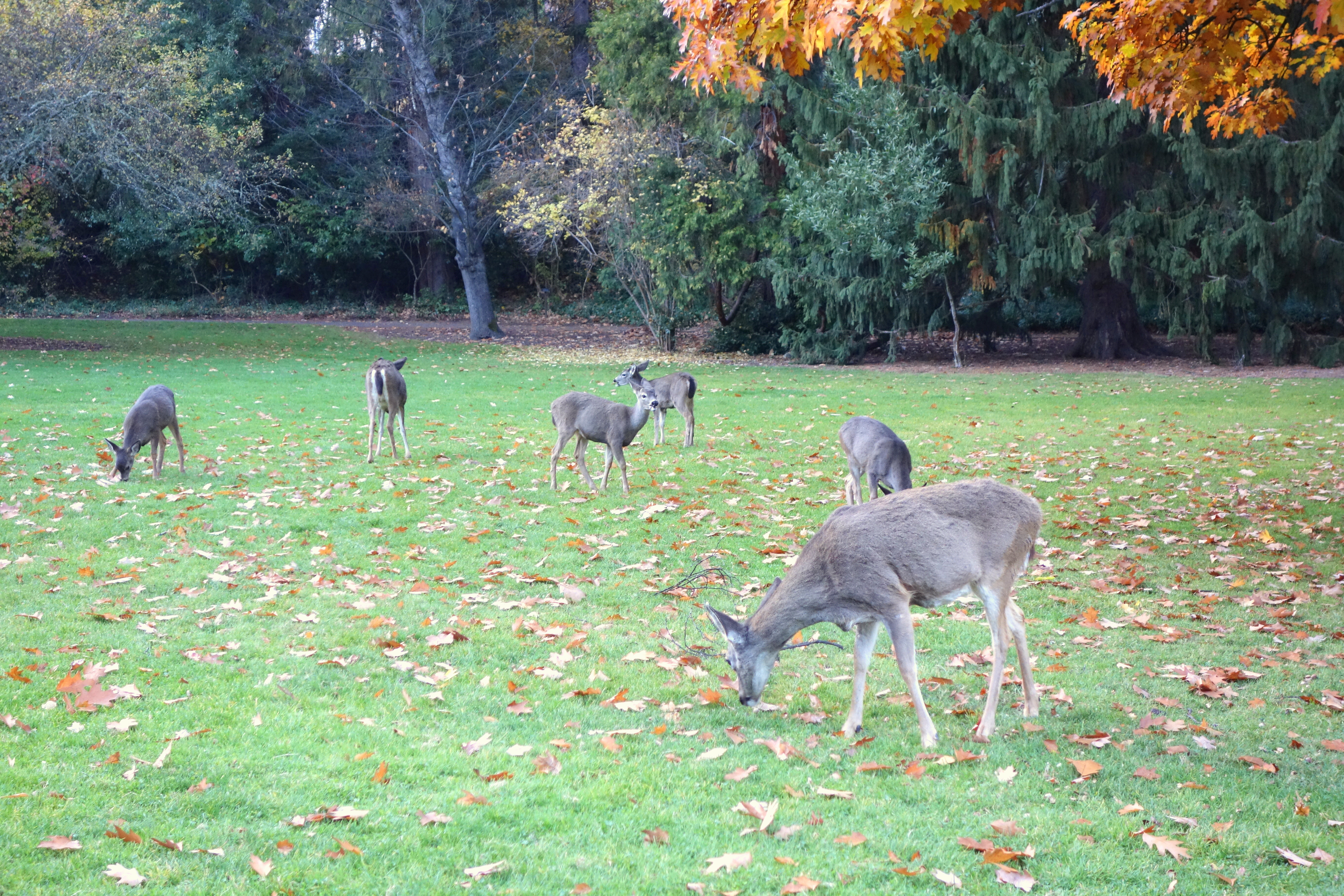
Deer grazing in the park

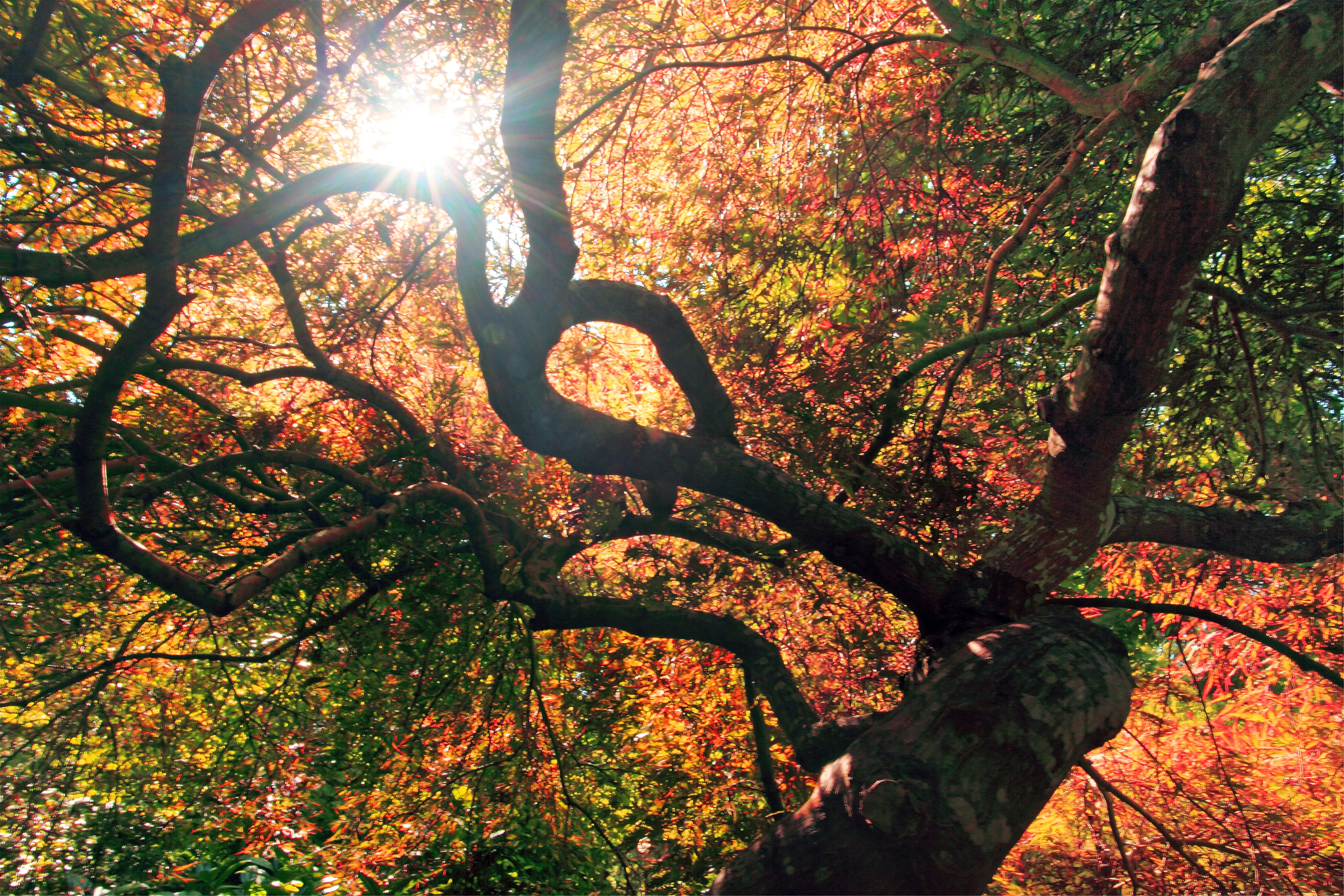
Sun seen through the tree canopy

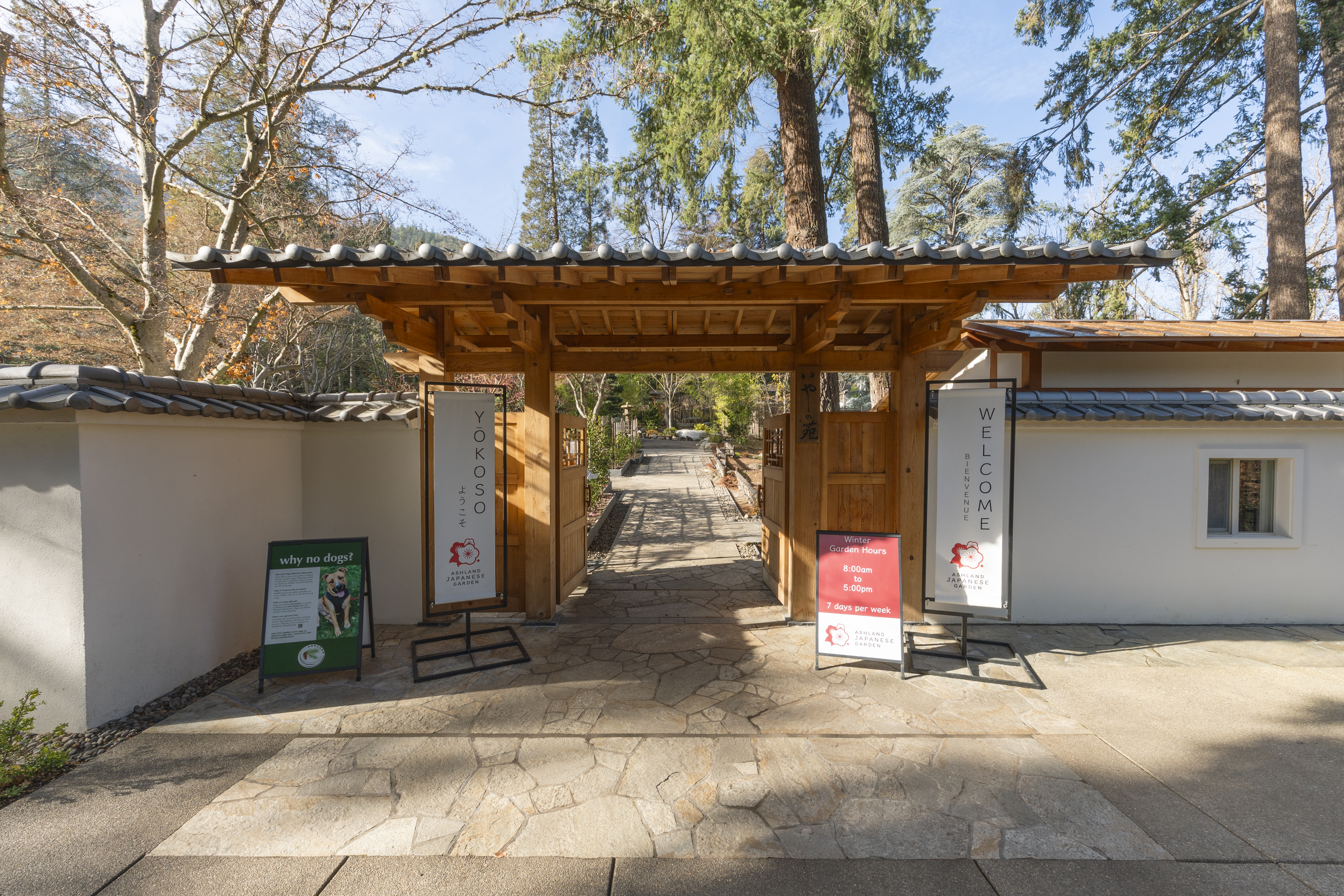
Japanese Garden

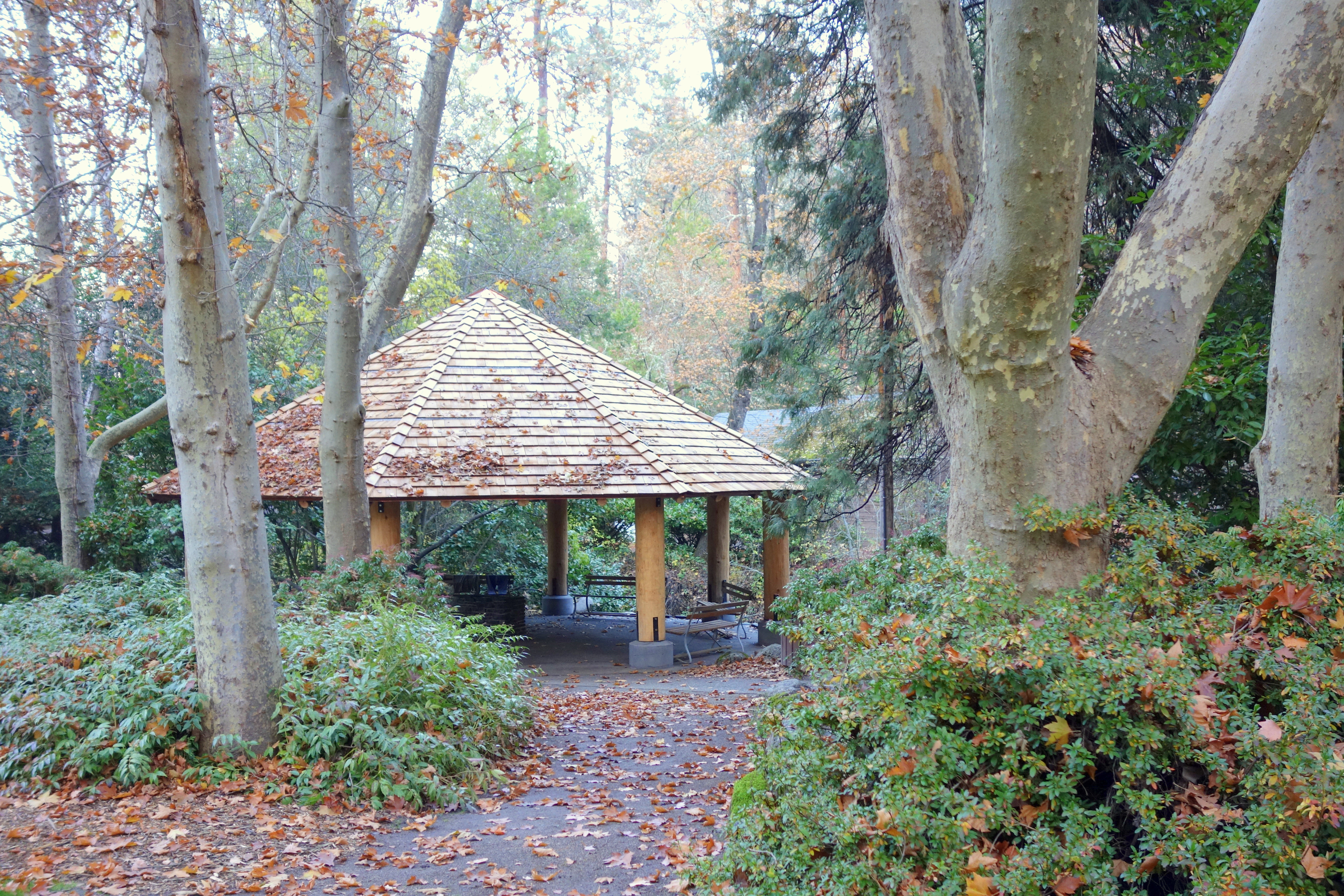
A pavilion in the park

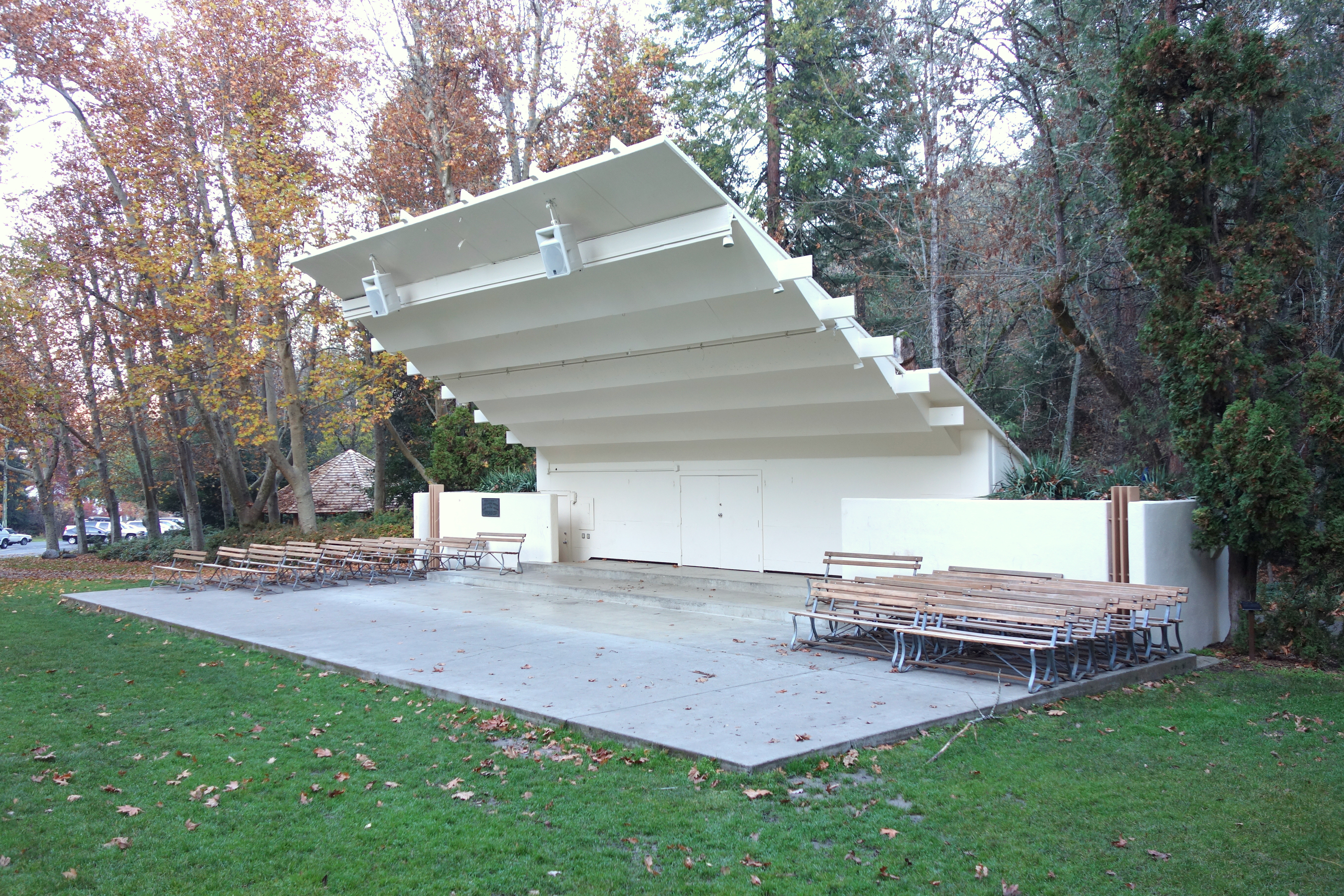
Bandshell for events

== See also ==
- Statue of Abraham Lincoln (Ashland, Oregon)
