= Nils Ahlstrom House =

- U.S. National Register of Historic Places
- U.S. Historic district – Contributing property
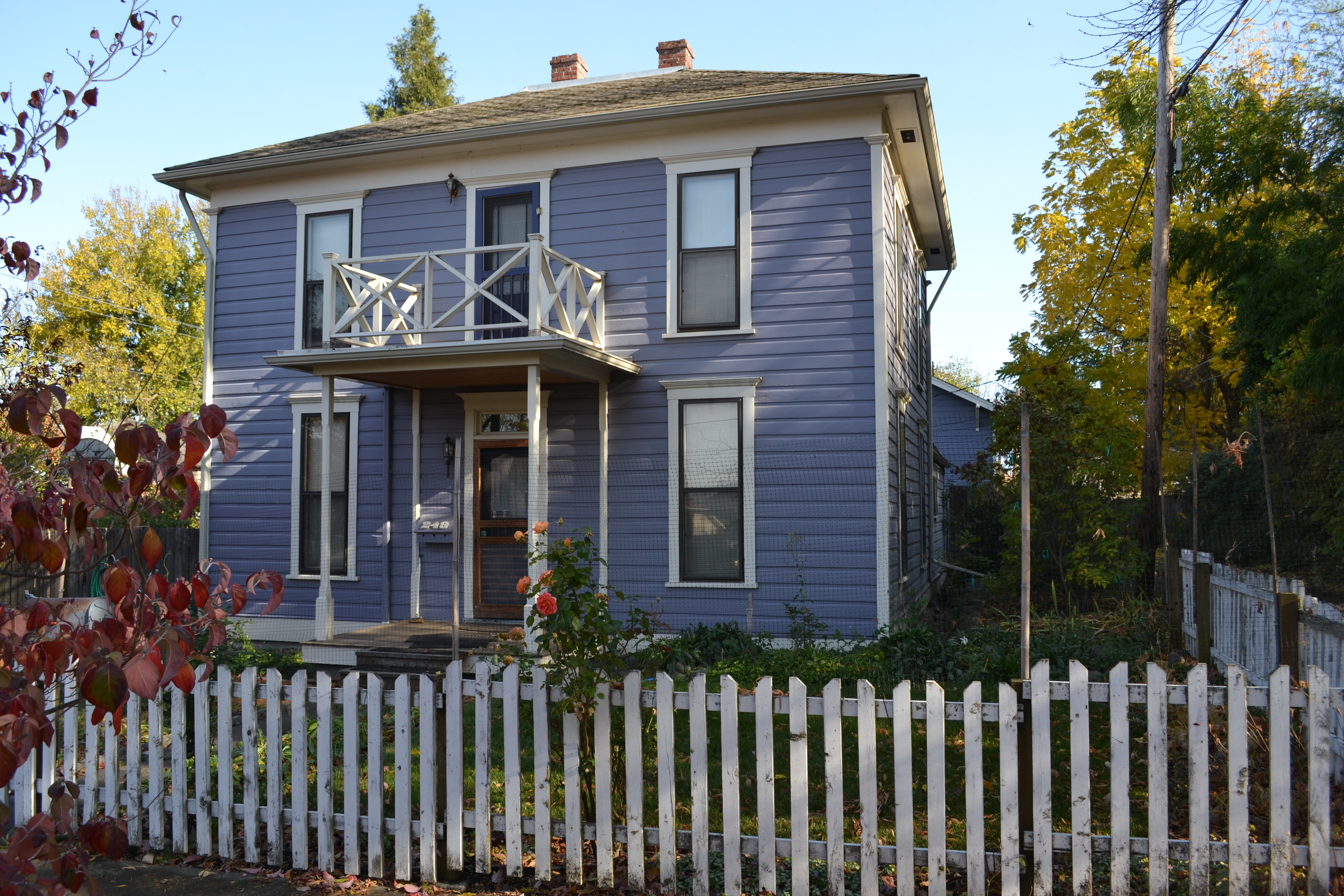
- The Ahlstrom House in 2011
- Location: 248 5th Street; Ashland, Oregon
- Coordinates: 42°11′50″N 122°42′21″W
- Area: Less than 1 acre (0.40 ha)
- Built: 1888
- Built by: John Fruhan
- Architectural style: Classical Revival
- Part of: Ashland Railroad Addition Historic District (ID99000533)
- NRHP reference No.: 80003315
- Added to NRHP: February 15, 1980

The Nils Ahlstrom House is a nineteenth century Classical Revival house located in Ashland, Oregon. Built in 1888 by Nils Ahlstrom, a railroad worker who had emigrated from Sweden, the home was listed on the National Register of Historic Places in 1980.

== History ==
The Nils Ahlstrom House was built for Nils Ahlstrom, then a conductor with the Southern Pacific Railroad. Ahlstrom, who was born in Sweden in 1829, relocated to Ashland, Oregon with his wife, Lavinia, also Swedish.

The house was built near the Ashland Depot shortly after the railroad that connected Ashland to Portland, Oregon, and northern California was completed in December 1887. The land on which the house was built was bought from George H. Andrews early in 1888. The two-story structure was built by John Fruhan and completed about October of that year. The construction of the structure was reported to have cost $800. The structure housed Ahlstrom's family, though five of his children died during a diphtheria outbreak. Ahlstrom died in May 1902 and his wife in 1920. Ownership then passed to one of their children. Currently the house remains privately owned.

== Structure ==
The classical revival structure was raised by John Fruhan, then a local workman. The building is T-shaped, incorporating a rectangular main structure and an additional wing towards the back.

The two-story structure rests on a stone foundation and has a hipped roof. There are four double-hung sash windows towards the front. Decorative moldings line the tops of the windows and the door frames. On the inside the main rectangular structure hosts four rooms downstairs with a kitchen and pantry located on the lower level in the wing section. Upstairs are five bedrooms, one of which is located, along with a bath and the staircase that leads from below, in the wing. The house also boasts two chimneys.

The house, which was entered on the National Register of Historic Places, also forms part of the Ashland Railroad Addition Historic District. The Ahlstrom house represents the type of structures common among railroad workers during the era just after the completion of the railroad. It was one of the first such structures to be built in Ashland during that period.
