= Steve Mason (poet) =

American poet

Stephen R. Mason
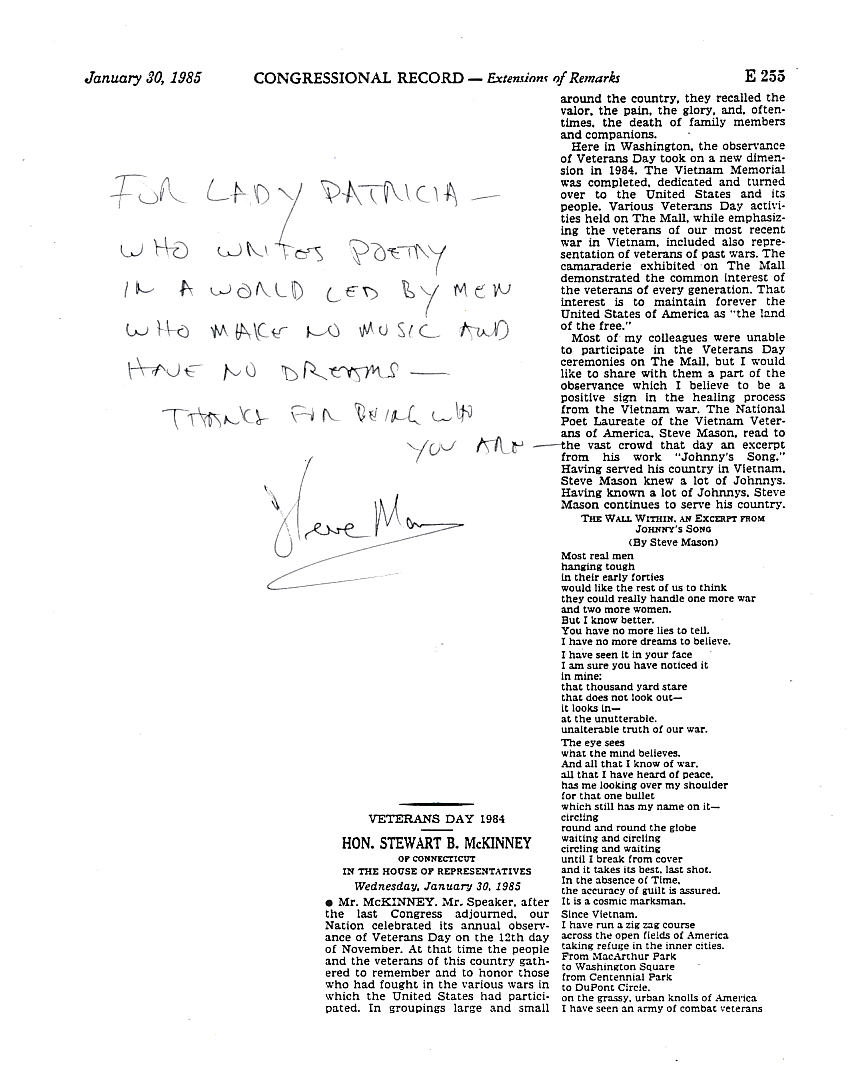
- Born: February 29, 1940; Brooklyn, New York
- Died: May 25, 2005 (aged 65); Medford, Oregon
- Occupations: Army captain; poet; author

Steve Mason (1940 in Brooklyn, New York – May 25, 2005) was a decorated United States Army captain, combat veteran of the Vietnam War, critically acclaimed poet and served as the Poet Laureate of the Vietnam Veterans of America.

== Poetry ==
Mason's poem "The Wall Within" was read at the 1984 dedication of the Vietnam Veterans Memorial in Washington, D.C. and has the distinction of being the only American work of poetry on display at the war memorial in Hanoi. The author of four books, his poetry related to his experiences as a captain in the United States Army during the Vietnam War. His work was hailed by veterans and their families nationwide.

Diagnosed with lung cancer as a result of exposure to Agent Orange during the war, he became a participant and active advocate for the Oregon Death with Dignity Act, and spoke at the California State Assembly for a similar law proposed in that state. He died at his home in Ashland, Oregon, at the age of 65. He is survived by four children.

Mason once said, "The truth is, that the only message I`ve taken from war, is peace.``

== Bibliography ==
- The Moths & Violets of Vito & Me: The Story of a Poem
- Johnny's Song: Poetry of a Vietnam Veteran
- Warrior for Peace
- The Human Being: A Warrior's Journey Toward Peace and Mutual Healing
