= Columbia Hotel =

Oldest Hotel in Ashland, Oregon

- Enders Building
- U.S. National Register of Historic Places
- U.S. Historic district – Contributing property
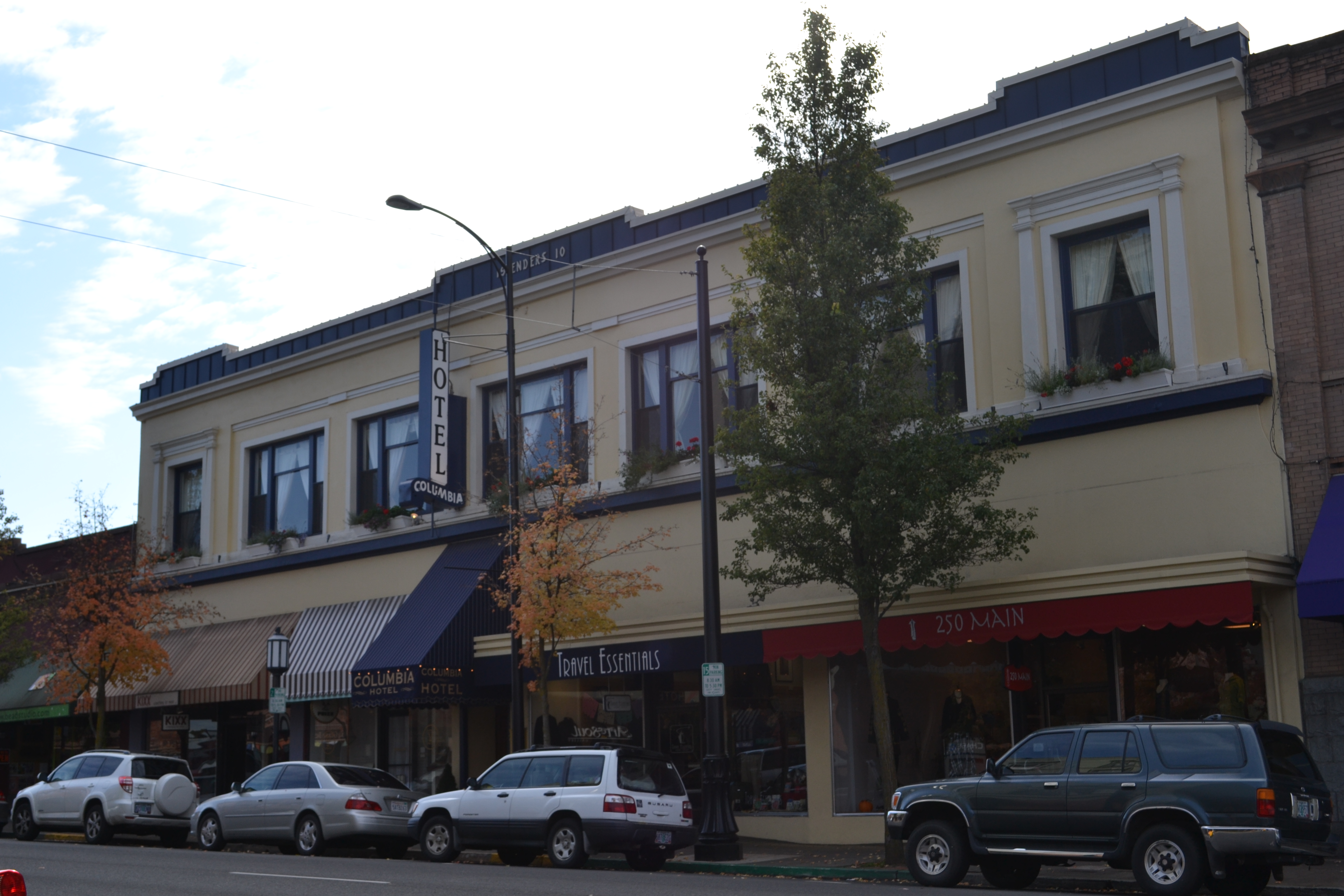
- Location: 262 E. Main Street; Ashland, Oregon
- Coordinates: 42°11′44″N 122°42′44″W
- Area: 0.9 acres (0.36 ha)
- Built: 1910
- Architect: Frank Chamberlain Clark
- Architectural style: Chicago / Commercial
- Website: https://www.columbiahotelashland.com/
- Part of: Ashland Downtown Historic District
- NRHP reference No.: 86002902
- Added to NRHP: October 23, 1986

The Columbia Hotel is a European-style hotel in Ashland, Oregon which first opened its doors in 1910. The hotel occupied the second floor of the Enders Building, listed on the National Register of Historic Places in 1986.

Designed by architect Frank Chamberlain Clark, the Enders Building was the first concrete commercial structure in Ashland. The Ashland Tidings, December 12, 1910, called it "the largest structure of its kind in Southern Oregon." Featuring characteristics of the Chicago style, it is also significant as an early example of a department store. Hotel accommodations on the second level were constructed to make it possible for shoppers from Northern California as well as from Oregon towns as far north as Grants Pass to travel to the mercantile shops in downtown Ashland by wagon, train, or car to shop and then stay the night at the hotel, and return home the next day.

For decades, under the direction of local businessman H.G. Enders, the building was the largest mercantile establishment between Sacramento and Portland. The Columbia Hotel, the only surviving Ashland hotel from this period, remained true to its original construction with much of the original fixtures, furniture, and all of the original millwork. Its interior featured an antique tin-lined wooden telephone booth, believed to be the oldest booth in Oregon still serving callers.

The same year the Enders Building brought its shops, restaurant, and Columbia Hotel to Ashland the Citizens Banking and Trust Co. Building went up next door (with a bank, grocery, and professional offices), while a four-story Elks Lodge (BPOE #944) was constructed directly across the street—all part of the 1909–1913 building boom that shifted attention and commerce away from Ashland's traditional town center, the Plaza. On October 10, 2010, Ashland temporarily closed a stretch of Main Street for a centennial celebration in which re-dedication ceremonies were held at both the Columbia Hotel and Elks Lodge.

The Columbia Hotel closed permanently on November 1, 2021, after 111 years in operation, the longest of any continuously operating hotel in Oregon. In May 2024, after two and a half years of vacancy, the Columbia Hotel was reopened with a redesigned interior. While many of the historical elements, such as the radiators and original floors, were kept intact, the hotel lobby and each room were decorated with unique art fixtures. Live musical performances are now held at the Columbia Hotel, and several beers on tap are served to hotel guests and the general public.
