= Dallen Bounds =

American serial killer (1971–1999)

- Born: Dallen Forrest Bounds; August 9, 1971; Ashland, Oregon, U.S.
- Died: December 23, 1999 (aged 28); Easley, South Carolina, U.S.
- Cause of death: Self-inflicted gunshot wound

Details
- Victims: 4
- Span of crimes: June 26 – December 23, 1999
- Country: United States
- State: South Carolina

Dallen Forrest Bounds (August 9, 1971 – December 23, 1999) was an American serial killer who killed four people in Greenville and Easley, South Carolina – two during robberies and another two out of personal animosity – between June and December 1999. The killings led to a manhunt resulting in him taking two women hostage and his eventual suicide to avoid arrest by authorities.

A definitive motive for the crimes was never established.

== Early life ==
Dallen Bounds was born on August 9, 1971, in Ashland, Oregon, and grew up in Lacey, Washington, where he attended the Timberline High School. Described as an average student with no special qualities about him, he was imprisoned for unspecified crimes as a juvenile, but as his record is sealed, it is unclear for what exactly and how long it lasted.

In April 1990, Bounds and 21-year-old Son Minh Hoang Underwood burglarized Gitcho's Discount Sales in Lacey, from where they stole four pistols, a rifle and a shotgun. Both men were detained and charged with first-degree burglary and possession of stolen property, with Bounds having his bail set at $15,000, while Underwood was held without bail. The pair were eventually convicted of one count of second-degree burglary and possession of stolen property, for which they served nine months in prison.

In the following three years, Bounds was arrested at least two more times for thefts in the cities of Olympia and Sedro-Woolley. While in prison, he was alleged to have developed ties with white supremacist organizations like the Ku Klux Klan and the Aryan Nations.

Between 1994 and 1996, Bounds married a woman and fathered a child. In 1996, the family moved to Lake Havasu City, Arizona, where he enrolled at the Charles of Italy Beauty College and found work as a butcher. In January 1997, Bounds was arrested and charged with domestic battery after he attempted to choke out his wife after she said to him that she wanted a divorce. When charged, he allegedly exclaimed that if he was going to go to prison, it would be for murdering his wife. However, this never occurred, and the charges were dropped - subsequently, his wife left him and moved with their daughter to Idaho, where she married another man.

=== Move to South Carolina ===
After living for a short period in Tucson, where he was charged but not prosecuted for disorderly conduct, Bounds and some friends decided to move to an apartment in Greenville, South Carolina sometime in early 1998. Around April of that year, he found a job at Michael's Arts & Crafts, where he was described positively by his manager and co-workers.

Over the next few months, Bounds worked a variety of jobs ranging from a butcher at a Publix to a delivery man, using fake identities. During this period, neighbors still regarded him as friendly, but noticed that he had a framed and matted picture of a lynching hanging in his apartment and a Ku Klux Klan Bible.

In June 1999, he met a 33-year-old health nurse named Sandra "Sandi" Roberts Ott, a divorced mother who regularly went to karaoke at a local bar. Bounds became enamored with Ott and attempted to start a relationship with her over the remainder of the summer, even going to her home and scattering rose petals on her driveway. However, it is unclear if the pair ever dated, and Ott later rebuked his advances. After this, Bounds started recording his thoughts and feelings in a diary, in which he wrote on multiple occasions how he was contemplating suicide and his life was seemingly falling apart.

== Murders ==
On June 26, 1999, Radio Shack employee Jonathan Lemuel Lara was restrained with flex ties to a chair in the back room of a Radio Shack in Greenville, before he was stabbed in the neck with a screwdriver. The attack struck his jugular vein, killing him on the spot. His co-worker arrived at the Radio Shack later that day, but was puzzled by the locked front door and the "Closed" sign - once he entered, he found Lara's body still tied to the chair and immediately called the police. Upon further inspection, it was discovered that money had been stolen from the cash register, and that Lara was last seen in the company of an unknown man and woman.

Six months later, on December 22, Bounds walked into a tiny flower shop on a busy street in broad daylight and killed the 30-year-old clerk, Karen Moore Hayden, leaving her face down in a back storage room in a pool of blood. The young wife and mother's body was found by a delivery man sent from the main Greenville-Pelham Florist Shop to check on her. He had to unlock the door to get inside after finding all of the store's lights turned off and the "Sorry, we're closed" sign hanging in the front window. Hayden's throat had been slit.

The day after killing Hayden, Bounds went to Easley, South Carolina, where he decided to break into the home of his former short-term girlfriend, 33-year-old nurse Sandra Roberts Ott. There, he shot her in the head, before chasing after her ex-husband, 32-year-old Timothy Ott. Timothy ran to the doorstep of his neighbor Idell Davenport, but found that the house was empty - before he could search for help elsewhere, Bounds caught up to him and shot him to death.

== Manhunt and suicide ==
Police were quickly alerted of the situation and were dispatched to the area. In the meantime, Bounds entered into various houses around the nearby city of Easley via unlocked doors. The first person he came across was an elderly woman living at 108 W. Seventh Street, but instead of harming her, he simply asked where the bathroom was before promptly leaving.

Not long after, he entered the home of a woman named Edna Adkins on 111 West Street, who allowed him in, thinking he was the grandson of a neighbor. Bounds stayed there for approximately half an hour, during which he watched TV, petted Adkins' dog and repeatedly asked if there was news of the recent murders.

At about 1 PM, he entered into a home on 211 South Third Street - inside were 87-year-old Martha Browning and granddaughter, Deanna "Dee" Tinsley. Initially, both women believed that Bounds was an acquaintance of the family, but when they realized that neither of them knew him, they asked him who he was. Bounds proceeded to close the blinds and readily confessed that he had murdered two people earlier and was on the run from law enforcement. He then said that the pair would stay inside with him, after which he cut off Browning's medical alarm and put it in his pocket.

For the remainder of the ordeal, Bounds remained in the living room and talked with Tinsley, while Browning went in the kitchen to make him some cookies. Throughout this time, Bounds appeared to alternate between asking questions about the family and expressing remorse for his actions. At one point, while Browning was preparing the cookies, she alerted her neighbor Karl Burkett that there was an intruder in the house.

After Burkett peered in to confirm it for himself, he left the house and immediately called the local police. This seemingly did not attract Bounds' attention, as he was focused on watching the news and a Christmas show, but started panicking after realizing that the police were surrounding the house. While he was distracted, officers entered the residence, allowing time for Browning to hide in a distant bedroom. When Tinsley attempted to flee as well, Bounds turned to look out of the window, but when he turned again, he saw a police officer who had come in to arrest him. Before that could occur, Bounds pointed his gun at his temple and fatally shot himself.

== Aftermath ==
Following his suicide, Bounds was linked to the murders of Lara and Hayden via a knife and bloody clothes found inside his apartment. Police also charged Casandra Cae Laster and Noah Benjamin Nedrow as accessories in the murder of Jonathan Lara.

While it is unclear if the prosecution against Nedrow continued, Laster was put on trial, convicted, and sentenced to 15 years imprisonment for aiding and abetting a fugitive. During the trial, her lawyer argued that she was afraid of Bounds and that she should be shown leniency, with Laster herself claiming that she never saw him shoot Lara. This was contradicted by the testimony of another roommate, Brian Gale, who claimed that she never appeared afraid of Bounds and seemed to be acting normally around him. She later appealed her sentence, but the appeal was denied by the South Carolina Court of Appeals.

== See also ==
- List of serial killers in the United States
- List of serial killers by number of victims
