= The Oregon Extension =

American Christian college program

Coordinates: 42°06′31″N 122°24′17″W

- Other names: The OE
- Type: Educational Extension Program
- Established: 1976
- Location: Lincoln, Oregon, United States
- Website: www.oregonextension.org

Location in the United States
Location in southern Oregon, east of Ashland

The Oregon Extension ("The OE") is an American college educational extension program focused on nature, religion, community, sustainability, and what it means to be human. The OE was established in 1975 and is located in the Cascade–Siskiyou National Monument, near Ashland, Oregon. With a focus on small-group learning, the OE provides a semester-long experience for students from colleges across the United States. In a survey of 200 alumni of the Oregon Extension, author Philip S. Francis says that the typical response was, "The Oregon Extension was a life-defining experience for me."

== History ==
In 1975, a group of professors from Trinity College in Deerfield, Illinois founded the Oregon Extension. One of the founders was Doug Frank. They formed the core faculty for thirty years before bringing in younger replacements in 2008 and 2012.

Students come to the OE from faith-based liberal arts colleges located across the United States. Each year the OE has from 20 to 30 students.

== Campus ==
The OE is located in the Cascade–Siskiyou National Monument, near Ashland, Oregon. The campus is an old logging town that was established in 1920 in Lincoln, Oregon. Students live in rustic cabins that are heated by wood stoves; occupancy is three or five students. The campus includes academic spaces, a recreational area, and a farm. The campus is primarily disconnected from cellphones and the Internet, but the school has two laptops for access to the Internet when needed.

== Academics ==
=== Curriculum ===
The OE is an accredited semester-long "intentional learning community" that provides seventeen credit hours. Classes consist of readings, writing, small group discussions, and conversations with the faculty. The semester is divided into four core themes, each explored one at a time in segments: nature, community, sustainability and the human person. The program utilizes a block scheduling method wherein students take one course at a time which explores one of the central themes. Students complete independent research projects at the end two of these segments. The third segment, focusing on sustainability, is largely skills based. Students can choose one of three skills courses in this segment: wood working, forest management, or nature writing.

Studies include art, biblical studies, biology, composition, communications, education, history, literature, philosophy, political science, psychology, rhetoric, science, sociology, and theology. Along with writing and reading, students participate in activities such as backpacking trips, camping, mountain climbing, hiking, or skiing. After each academic segment, comprising roughly two and half weeks, students take an off-campus excursion. These trips include: backpacking in the Trinity Alps, camping at the Oregon coast, exploring San Francisco, and cross-country skiing at Crater Lake. During the semester, students are responsible for chores and farm posts such as: organic gardening, harvesting vegetables, food preservation, feeding chickens, raising turkeys, milking goats, making cheese, cultivating mushrooms, chopping wood, composting waste, and community recycling.

=== Faculty ===
Faculty are brought in from various academic backgrounds from colleges around the country and live on campus during the semester. Daily book discussion groups occur inside faculty homes.
