= Ashland New Plays Festival =

American non-profit organization

The Ashland New Plays Festival (ANPF) is an American non-profit organization based in Ashland, Oregon, that motivates playwrights in the creation of new works through public readings. The organization was founded in 1992 and is managed by a volunteer board of directors and artistic board.

ANPF's flagship festival is a playwright competition that culminates in the reading of four new plays culled from hundreds of submissions. The festival features professional actors from the Oregon Shakespeare Festival and the community.

In 2011, more than 200 playwrights participated through submissions and at the festival.

The first few festivals were collaborations between local theater groups. As the years passed, the festival grew to draw participants from across the United States. In 2009, management of the festival was taken over by a group of volunteers from the festival's past.

== Participants and awards ==
Playwrights such as David Rambo, Jamie Pachino, Lisa Loomer, and E. M. Lewis have worked with ANPF over the years. Award winners are listed on their website from 1993 to the present, in addition to the biographies of the playwrights.
