= Ashland, Oregon =

- City
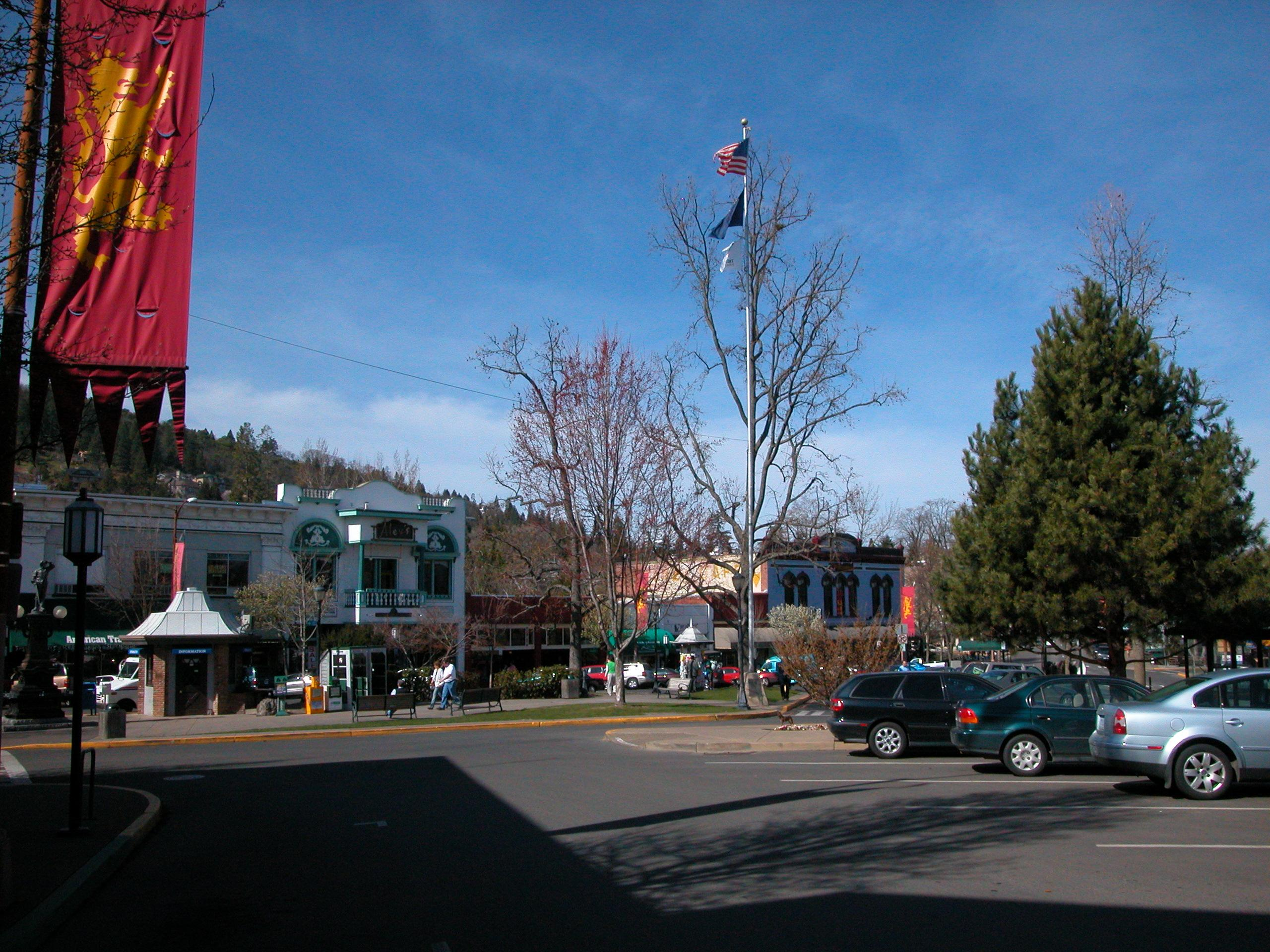
- The Plaza

- Location of Ashland in Jackson County and in the state of Oregon

- Location in Oregon Ashland (the United States) Ashland (North America)
- Coordinates: 42°11′29″N 122°42′03″W
- Country: United States
- State: Oregon
- County: Jackson
- Settled: 1852

Government
  - Mayor: Tonya Graham

Area
  - Total: 6.64 sq mi (17.19 km^{2})
  - Land: 6.64 sq mi (17.19 km^{2})
  - Water: 0 sq mi (0.00 km^{2})
- Elevation: 1,949 ft (594 m)

Population (2020)
  - Total: 21,360
  - Density: 3,218.9/sq mi (1,242.84/km^{2})
- Time zone: UTC−8 (Pacific)
  - Summer (DST): UTC−7 (Pacific)
- ZIP code: 97520
- Area codes: 541 and 458
- FIPS code: 41-03050
- GNIS feature ID: 2409740
- Website: ashlandoregon.gov

Ashland is a city in Jackson County, Oregon, United States. It lies along Interstate 5 approximately 16 miles (26 km) north of the California border and near the south end of the Rogue Valley. The city's population was 21,360 at the 2020 census.

The city is the home of Southern Oregon University (SOU) and the Oregon Shakespeare Festival (OSF). These are important contributors to Ashland's economy, which also depends on restaurants, galleries, and retail stores that cater to tourists. Lithia Park along Ashland Creek, historic buildings, and a paved intercity bike trail provide additional visitor attractions.

Ashland, originally called "Ashland Mills", was named after Ashland County, Ohio, the original home of founder Abel Helman, and secondarily for Ashland, Kentucky, where other founders had family connections. Ashland has a council-manager government assisted by citizen committees.

== History ==
Prior to the arrival of White settlers in mid-19th century, the Shasta people lived in the valley along Ashland Creek approximately where today's city is located. Early Hudson's Bay Company hunters and trappers following the Siskiyou Trail passed through the site in the 1820s. In the late 1840s, mainly American settlers following the Applegate Trail began passing through the area. By the early 1850s, the Donation Land Claim Act brought many to the Rogue Valley and into conflict with its native people. These often violent clashes, known ultimately as the Rogue River Wars, continued until 1856.

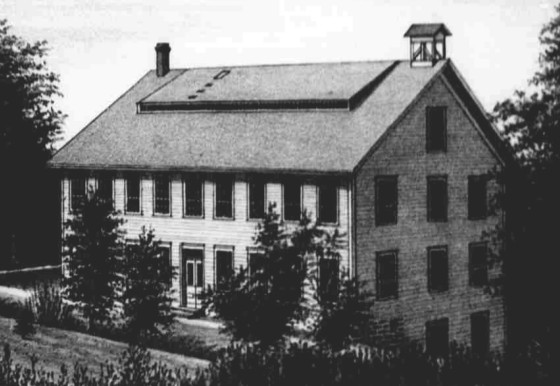
The Ashland Woolen Mills c. 1881

In 1851, gold was discovered at Rich Gulch, a tributary of Jackson Creek, and a tent city grew on its banks, today's Jacksonville. Settlers arrived in the Ashland area in January 1852, including Robert B. Hargadine, Sylvester Pease, Abel D. Helman, Eber Emery, and others. Helman and Hargadine filed the first donation land claims in Ashland. Helman and Emery built a sawmill along what was then called Mill Creek to turn timber into lumber for settlers. In 1854, they and another settler, M. B. Morris, built a second mill, Ashland Flouring Mills, to grind local wheat into flour. The community around the mill became known as "Ashland Mills". A post office was established in Ashland Mills in 1855 with Helman as postmaster.

During the 1860s and 1870s the community grew, establishing a school, churches, businesses and a large employer, Ashland Woolen Mills, which produced clothing and blankets from local wool. In 1871, the Post Office dropped "Mills" from Ashland's name. In 1872 Reverend J. H. Skidmore opened a college, Ashland Academy, a predecessor of Southern Oregon University.

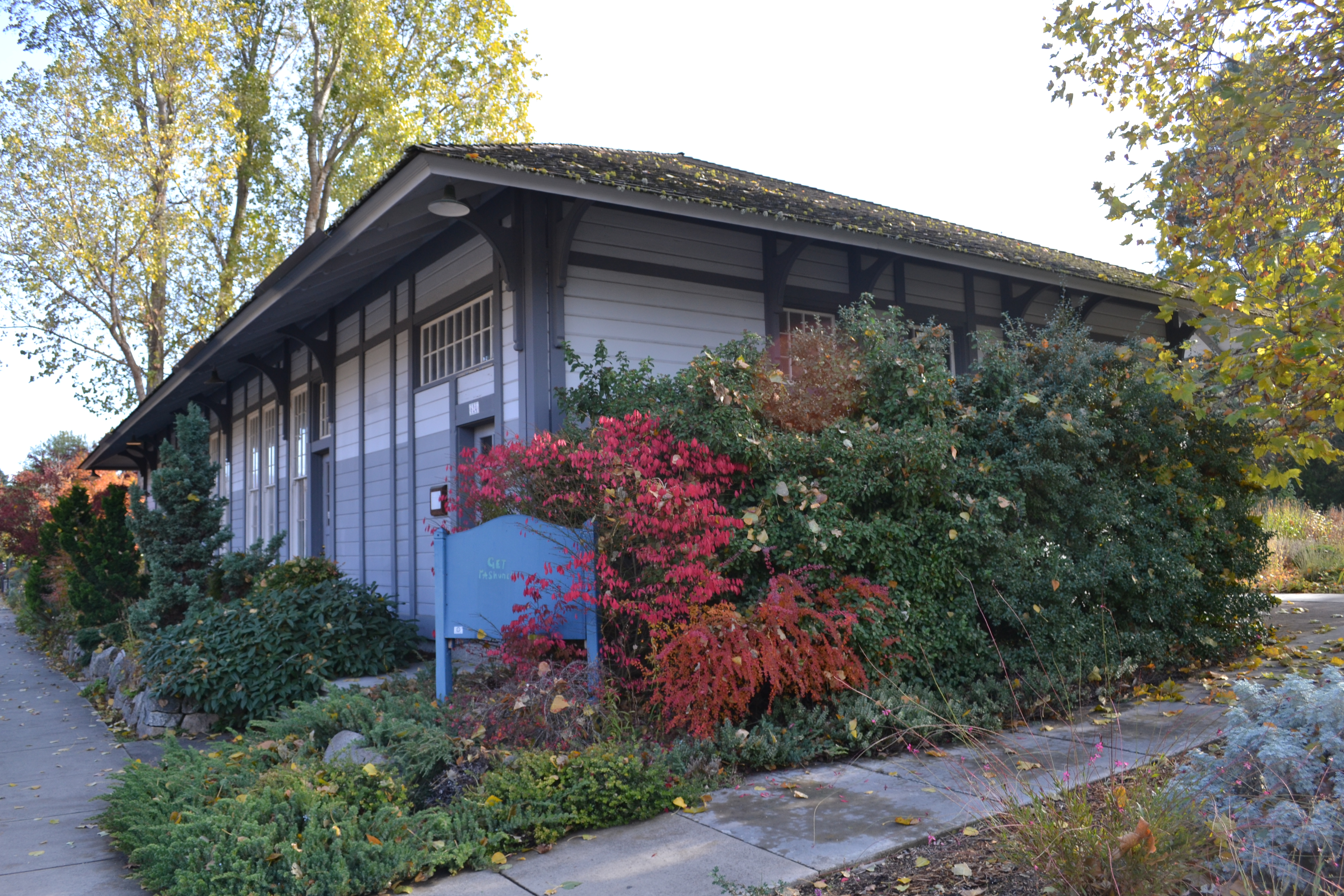
The south wing of the Depot Hotel, listed on the National Register of Historic Places, is the primary reminder of the city's railway heritage.

In 1887, Portland, Oregon, and San Francisco, California, were joined by rail at Ashland. Until 1926, when most rail service began taking a different route (east through Klamath Falls to avoid the steep grade through the Siskiyou Mountains), Ashland thrived on rail trade of local products, including pears, peaches, and apples.

In 1908, the Women's Civic Improvement Club petitioned for the creation of community space along Ashland Creek, which became Ashland Canyon Park. The discovery of lithia water near Emigrant Lake around the same time led to a plan to establish a mineral spa at the park. Voters approved bonds to pay for the project, which included piping the mineral water from its source to Ashland. The town engaged John McLaren, landscape architect of San Francisco's Golden Gate Park, to design the park, renamed Lithia Springs Park, later shortened to Lithia Park. Although the park was popular, the mineral spa plans proved too expensive for local taxpayers and were abandoned in 1916. Meanwhile, entrepreneurs took to bottling and selling mineral waters from the area's springs.

During the Fourth of July celebration in 1935, Angus L. Bowmer arranged the first performances of what would become the annual Oregon Shakespeare Festival.

Ashland was a sundown town at least until World War II.

Many of Ashland's historic buildings have been preserved and restored. The city has 59 individual structures and four historic districts (Downtown District, Siskiyou-Hargadine District, Railroad District, Skidmore Academy District) on the National Register of Historic Places. The structures include the Enders Building (home of the Columbia Hotel), which from 1910 to 1928 contained the largest mercantile establishment between Sacramento and Portland. Some of Ashland's houses built before 1900 are: the Orlando Coolidge House (1875), the Isaac Woolen House (1876), the W. H. Atkinson House (1880), the John McCall House (1883), the Nils Ahlstrom House (1888), the H. B. Carter House (1888), and the Colonel William H. Silsby House (1896). The E. V. Carter House (built in 1909) is in a remarkably good state of preservation.

== Geography ==
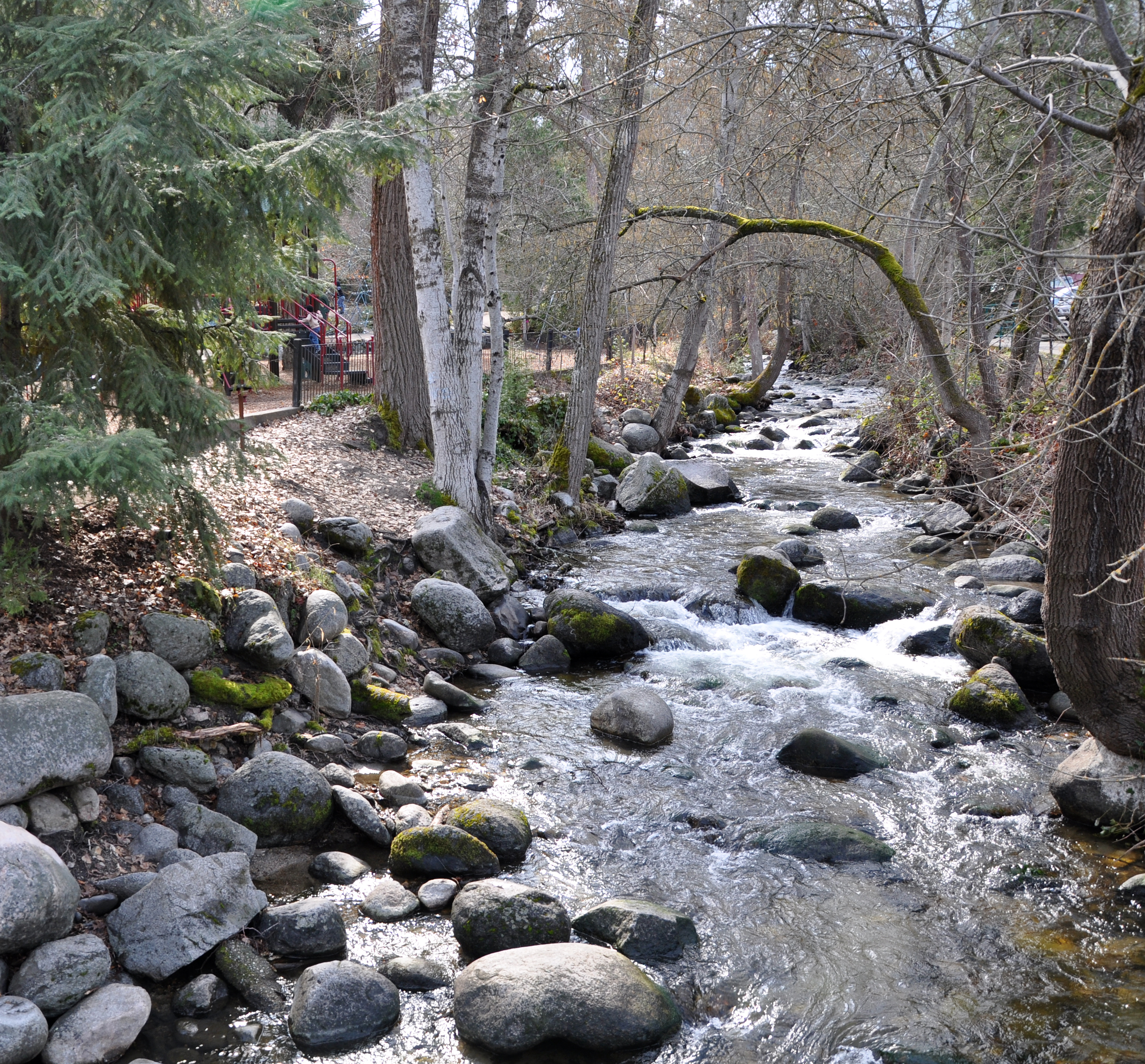
Ashland Creek in Lithia Park

Ashland is at 1,949 feet (594 m) above sea level in the foothills of the Siskiyou and Cascade ranges, about 15 miles (24 km) north of the California border on Interstate 5 (I-5). About 10 miles (16 km) south of Ashland and 5 miles (8 km) north of the California border is Siskiyou Summit, which at 4,310 feet (1,310 m) is the highest point on I-5. Ashland is about 12 miles (19 km) southeast of Medford and 285 miles (459 km) south of Portland. According to the United States Census Bureau, the city has a total area of about 6.6 square miles (17.1 km^{2}), all land.

Ashland Creek and its tributaries begin on the flanks of Mount Ashland, at 7,533 feet (2,296 m) above sea level in the Siskiyou Mountains south of the city. Upstream (south) of the city boundary, these streams flow mainly through the Rogue River–Siskiyou National Forest. The creek flows through the city to meet Bear Creek, which roughly parallels I-5 along the east side of Ashland. Bear Creek, one of many streams in the Rogue Valley, flows generally northwest to join the Rogue River near Gold Hill, and from there the river flows generally west to its mouth on the Pacific Ocean.

Oregon Route 99, running roughly parallel to I-5, passes through downtown Ashland. Oregon Route 66 enters Ashland from the east and intersects Route 99 near the city center. Route 66 leads east 63 miles (101 km) to Klamath Falls.

=== Climate ===
Ashland lies within Oregon's southwest interior climate zone, in which all but the higher-elevation sites are in the rain shadow of the Oregon Coast Range to the west. The largest urban areas in this zone in addition to Ashland are Medford and Grants Pass in the Rogue Valley, and Roseburg in the Umpqua River Valley further north. Although the mountain peaks in this zone receive up to 120 inches or 3,050 millimetres of precipitation a year, the urban areas and the valleys in which they lie generally get 20 inches (510 mm) or less. This valley climate is particularly good for growing fruit, especially pears, and for producing other crops and farm goods such as hay, grain, poultry, and beef.

Cloud cover in nearby Medford varies from an average of 21 percent in July to 86 percent in December. On average, precipitation falls in Ashland on 114 days each year and totals about 20 inches (510 mm). The average annual snowfall is only 1.4 inches or 0.04 metres. The average relative humidity, measured at 4 p.m. daily, is 47 percent in Medford, varying from 26 percent in July to 76 percent in December. According to the Köppen climate classification system, Ashland has a warm-summer Mediterranean climate (Csb).

On average, Ashland tends to be 2–3 °F cooler than Medford due to being 600 feet higher in elevation. The coolest month is December, with an average high temperature of 47 °F or 8.3 °C, and the warmest month is July, with an average high of about 88 °F or 31.1 °C. The highest temperature ever recorded in Ashland was 112 °F (44.4 °C), observed on June 29, 2021, and the record low of −4 °F (−20 °C) occurred in December 1972. The wettest "rain year" has been from July 1926 to June 1927 with 29.77 inches (756.2 mm) and the driest from July 1954 to June 1955 with only 10.37 inches (263.4 mm). The wettest month on record has been December 1964 with 11.28 inches (286.5 mm), but the only other months with over 8 inches or 203.2 millimetres have been December 1996 with 10.89 inches (276.6 mm), November 1903 with 8.10 inches (205.7 mm) and November 1998 with 8.03 inches (204.0 mm).

Ashland's coldest recorded daytime temperature was 15 °F (−9 °C) in December 1972. During the full year, the coldest day of the year averages around 34 °F (1 °C) or just above freezing. Warm summer nights are rare, with the record of 74 °F (23 °C) being set as far back as 1910. The mean for the warmest summer night between 1991 and 2020 was at a mild 62 °F (17 °C).

Climate data for Ashland, Oregon (1991–2020 normals)
Month	Jan	Feb	Mar	Apr	May	Jun	Jul	Aug	Sep	Oct	Nov	Dec	Year
Record high °F (°C)	72 (22)	78 (26)	82 (28)	94 (34)	101 (38)	105 (41)	106 (41)	108 (42)	103 (39)	97 (36)	80 (27)	70 (21)	108 (42)
Mean maximum °F (°C)	63 (17)	68 (20)	73 (23)	81 (27)	89 (32)	94 (34)	99 (37)	99 (37)	95 (35)	84 (29)	70 (21)	62 (17)	101 (38)
Mean daily maximum °F (°C)	49.0 (9.4)	53.7 (12.1)	58.0 (14.4)	62.8 (17.1)	71.1 (21.7)	78.5 (25.8)	88.1 (31.2)	87.4 (30.8)	80.8 (27.1)	68.0 (20.0)	54.2 (12.3)	47.2 (8.4)	66.6 (19.2)
Daily mean °F (°C)	39.3 (4.1)	41.7 (5.4)	44.9 (7.2)	49.0 (9.4)	56.1 (13.4)	62.1 (16.7)	69.4 (20.8)	68.4 (20.2)	62.0 (16.7)	52.0 (11.1)	43.3 (6.3)	38.2 (3.4)	52.2 (11.2)
Mean daily minimum °F (°C)	29.6 (−1.3)	29.7 (−1.3)	31.8 (−0.1)	35.2 (1.8)	41.2 (5.1)	45.8 (7.7)	50.6 (10.3)	49.4 (9.7)	43.3 (6.3)	36.1 (2.3)	32.5 (0.3)	29.2 (−1.6)	37.9 (3.3)
Mean minimum °F (°C)	19 (−7)	21 (−6)	23 (−5)	26 (−3)	31 (−1)	37 (3)	43 (6)	42 (6)	35 (2)	26 (−3)	21 (−6)	17 (−8)	14 (−10)
Record low °F (°C)	−1 (−18)	−1 (−18)	15 (−9)	20 (−7)	23 (−5)	29 (−2)	32 (0)	34 (1)	27 (−3)	13 (−11)	12 (−11)	−4 (−20)	−4 (−20)
Average precipitation inches (mm)	2.35 (60)	2.04 (52)	2.03 (52)	1.95 (50)	1.64 (42)	0.85 (22)	0.44 (11)	0.37 (9.4)	0.50 (13)	1.41 (36)	2.57 (65)	3.38 (86)	19.53 (498.4)
Average snowfall inches (cm)	0 (0)	0.3 (0.76)	0 (0)	0 (0)	0 (0)	0 (0)	0 (0)	0 (0)	0 (0)	0 (0)	0 (0)	0.2 (0.51)	0.5 (1.27)
Average precipitation days (≥ 0.01 in)	14.1	11.9	13.4	12.7	9.6	5.3	2.5	2.6	3.9	7.5	15.2	15.0	113.7
Source: NOAA

== Demographics ==
Historical population
Census	Pop.	Note	%±
1860	327		—
1870	400		22.3%
1880	842		110.5%
1890	1,784		111.9%
1900	2,634		47.6%
1910	5,020		90.6%
1920	4,283		−14.7%
1930	4,544		6.1%
1940	4,744		4.4%
1950	7,739		63.1%
1960	9,119		17.8%
1970	12,342		35.3%
1980	14,943		21.1%
1990	16,234		8.6%
2000	19,522		20.3%
2010	20,078		2.8%
2020	21,360		6.4%
Census sources

=== Racial and ethnic composition ===
Racial composition as of the 2020 census
Race	Number	Percent
White	17,696	82.8%
Black or African American	244	1.1%
American Indian and Alaska Native	185	0.9%
Asian	475	2.2%
Native Hawaiian and Other Pacific Islander	71	0.3%
Some other race	779	3.6%
Two or more races	1,910	8.9%
Hispanic or Latino (of any race)	1,616	7.6%

=== 2020 census ===
As of the 2020 census, Ashland had a population of 21,360. The median age was 45.4 years. 14.3% of residents were under the age of 18 and 28.0% of residents were 65 years of age or older. For every 100 females there were 85.3 males, and for every 100 females age 18 and over there were 82.8 males age 18 and over.

99.9% of residents lived in urban areas, while 0.1% lived in rural areas.

There were 9,832 households in Ashland, of which 19.1% had children under the age of 18 living in them. Of all households, 37.2% were married-couple households, 19.9% were households with a male householder and no spouse or partner present, and 34.7% were households with a female householder and no spouse or partner present. About 36.3% of all households were made up of individuals and 18.9% had someone living alone who was 65 years of age or older.

There were 10,966 housing units, of which 10.3% were vacant. Among occupied housing units, 54.6% were owner-occupied and 45.4% were renter-occupied. The homeowner vacancy rate was 1.7% and the rental vacancy rate was 8.2%.

=== 2010 census ===
At the 2010 census, there were 20,078 people, 9,409 households, and 4,542 families residing in the city. The population density was 3,047 inhabitants per square mile (1,176/km^{2}). There were 10,455 housing units at an average density of 1,587 per square mile (613/km^{2}). The racial makeup of the city was about 90% White, 2% Asian, 1% African American, 1% Native American, 0.3% Pacific Islander, 1.4% from other races, and 4% from two or more races. Hispanic or Latino residents of any race were about 5% of the population.

There were 9,409 households, out of which about 21% had children under the age of 18 living with them. About 34% were married couples living together; 10% had a female householder with no husband present, about 4% had a male householder with no wife present, and about 52% were non-families. About 38% of all households were made up of individuals, and 13.5% had someone living alone who was 65 years of age or older. The average household size was 2.03 and the average family size was 2.63.

The median age in the city was 42.9 years. About 16% of residents were under the age of 18, and about 16% were between the ages of 18 and 24. Rounded to the nearest whole number, 21% were from 25 to 44 years old; 30% were from 45 to 64; and 18% were 65 years of age or older. The gender makeup of the city was about 46% male and 54% female.

In 2010, the median income for a household in the city was $41,334, and the median income for a family was $58,409. Males had a median income of $50,368 versus $34,202 for females. The per capita income for the city was $28,941. About 21% of the population and 13% of families had incomes below the poverty line. Out of the total population, about 30% of those under the age of 18 and 3.5% of those 65 and older were living below the poverty line.

== Government ==
Ashland has a council-manager government since a Charter Amendment was passed by the voters in a Special Election in May 2020, (changing the form of government from Mayor/Administrator). It consists of a city manager, a mayor, and six council members. The mayor and council members are elected by the city's voters to serve staggered four-year terms.

Julie Akins, after serving a partial term as a city councilor, was elected as mayor in 2020. On January 23, 2023, she announced her resignation effective January 27. On February 7, the council unanimously elected Tonya Graham to serve the remainder of Akins' term.

Pam Marsh, a Democrat from Ashland, represents Ashland and all of Oregon House District 5 in the state legislature. As part of Oregon Senate District 3, Ashland is represented by Democrat Jeff Golden. At the federal level, Cliff Bentz, a Republican, represents Ashland as part of Oregon's 2nd congressional district in the United States House of Representatives. Ron Wyden and Jeff Merkley, both Democrats, serve the state of Oregon in the United States Senate.

Historically, Ashland has been a political outlier in southwest Oregon. In the presidential election of 1860, Ashland favored Abraham Lincoln while its neighbors strongly preferred pro-slavery candidates. In the early 1900s, Ashland voters supported women's suffrage and prohibition, generally out of step with the rest of the region. In more recent elections, Ashland has supported tax levies and environmental regulations opposed by voters elsewhere in Jackson and nearby counties. Critics sometimes refer to the city as the People's Republic of Ashland.

== Economy ==
Income from tourism is important to Ashland's economy. A large number of restaurants, galleries, and retail stores cater to thousands of visitors who attend plays each year at the Oregon Shakespeare Festival. In 2011, the festival sold more than 390,000 tickets to its theater productions.

The town's largest employer is Southern Oregon University (SOU), which has a faculty and staff of more than 750. In addition to the Oregon Shakespeare Festival and the university, health-service providers make significant contributions to the economy. Businesses related to outdoor recreation, transportation, technology, and light manufacturing are also important. In 2010, the Shakespeare Festival employed about 500 people, the hospital about 400, the public schools about 300, and the City of Ashland about 250. The Bathroom Readers' Press, which produces the Uncle John's Bathroom Reader books, is based in Ashland and San Diego. Brammo, specializing in battery-electric motorcycles, was based in Ashland but moved to Talent.

== Arts and culture ==
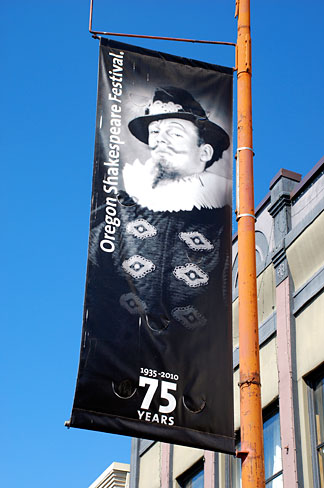
Oregon Shakespeare Festival 75th anniversary banner

The Oregon Shakespeare Festival (OSF) has grown from a summer outdoor series in the 1930s to a season that stretches from February to October, incorporating Shakespearean and non-Shakespearean plays at three theaters. The OSF has become the largest regional repertory theater in the United States.

The Oregon Cabaret Theater features musicals and comedy throughout the year. Opened in 1986, the dinner theater occupies a former First Baptist Church built in Mission Revival style. The Ashland Independent Film Festival, which shows international and domestic films of almost every genre, takes place each April in the Varsity Theatre downtown. About 90 films are shown during the five days of the festival. In 2009, Ashland was the setting for the film adaptation of Neil Gaiman's Coraline.

The Oregon Center for the Arts at Southern Oregon University focuses on academic programs including creative arts (art, emerging media and creative writing), music, and theater. Affiliated with the center is the Schneider Museum of Art, which has rotation exhibitions of works featuring professional contemporary artists. Also affiliated with the center are chamber music concerts, a Shakespeare institute, a piano series, and other art-related events.

The annual Ashland New Plays Festival (ANPF) is a nonprofit organization that encourages playwrights to develop new work through public readings. Each year, the ANPF holds an international competition that winnows hundreds of submissions to four plays that are read to live audiences by professional actors during a five-day festival in October.

=== Museums and other points of interest ===
The National Fish and Wildlife Forensics Laboratory in Ashland is the world's only laboratory dedicated to solving crimes against wildlife. Using forensic science, experts at the laboratory help wildlife officers to investigate possible crimes against animals and to establish links between victims and suspects in cases that go to court. The laboratory has assisted the International Criminal Police Organization (INTERPOL) and foreign agencies concerned with the Convention on International Trade in Endangered Species (CITES).

The Ashland City Band (ACB) was organized in the late 19th century as the Ashland Brass Band. The band used an octagonal gazebo-style bandstand in Lithia Park until the Butler Memorial Band Shell was built in Lithia Park in 1946. The ACB gives public concerts there each summer between June and August.

== Parks ==
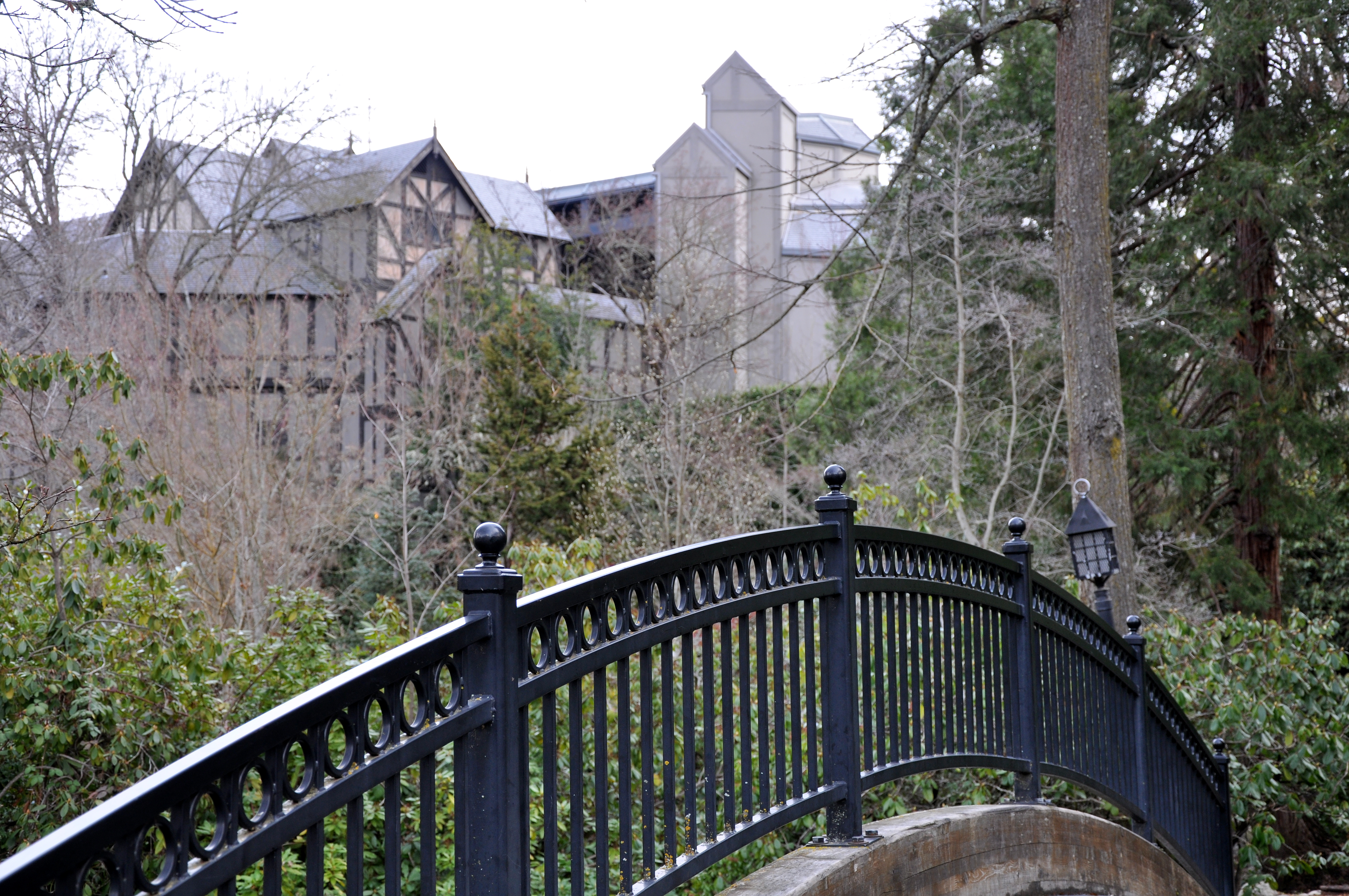
View of OSF buildings from a footbridge in Lithia Park

Lithia Park is a 93-acre (38 ha) park, including 42 acres (17 ha) on the National Register of Historic Places, that begins near the downtown shopping area and extends upstream along Ashland Creek near the center of the city. It includes two ponds, a Japanese garden, pickleball courts, two public greens, a bandshell (outdoor stage) and miles of hiking trails. The name Lithia comes from natural mineral water found in the Ashland area. It has a strong mineral taste and slight effervescence, and the lithia water fountains found on the town plaza are frequently tasted by unsuspecting tourists (often at the behest of residents or frequent visitors who use the fountains as a cheap, humorous Ashland initiation rite).

A hiking and biking path, the Bear Creek Greenway, begins in Ashland near the intersection of West Nevada Street with Helman Street, close to the confluence of Ashland Creek (which flows through Lithia Park). The 18-mile (29 km) path follows Bear Creek between Ashland and Central Point and passes through Talent, Phoenix, and Medford.

Calle Guanajuato is a small park bordering Ashland Creek, with several restaurants offering outdoor dining.

== Education ==
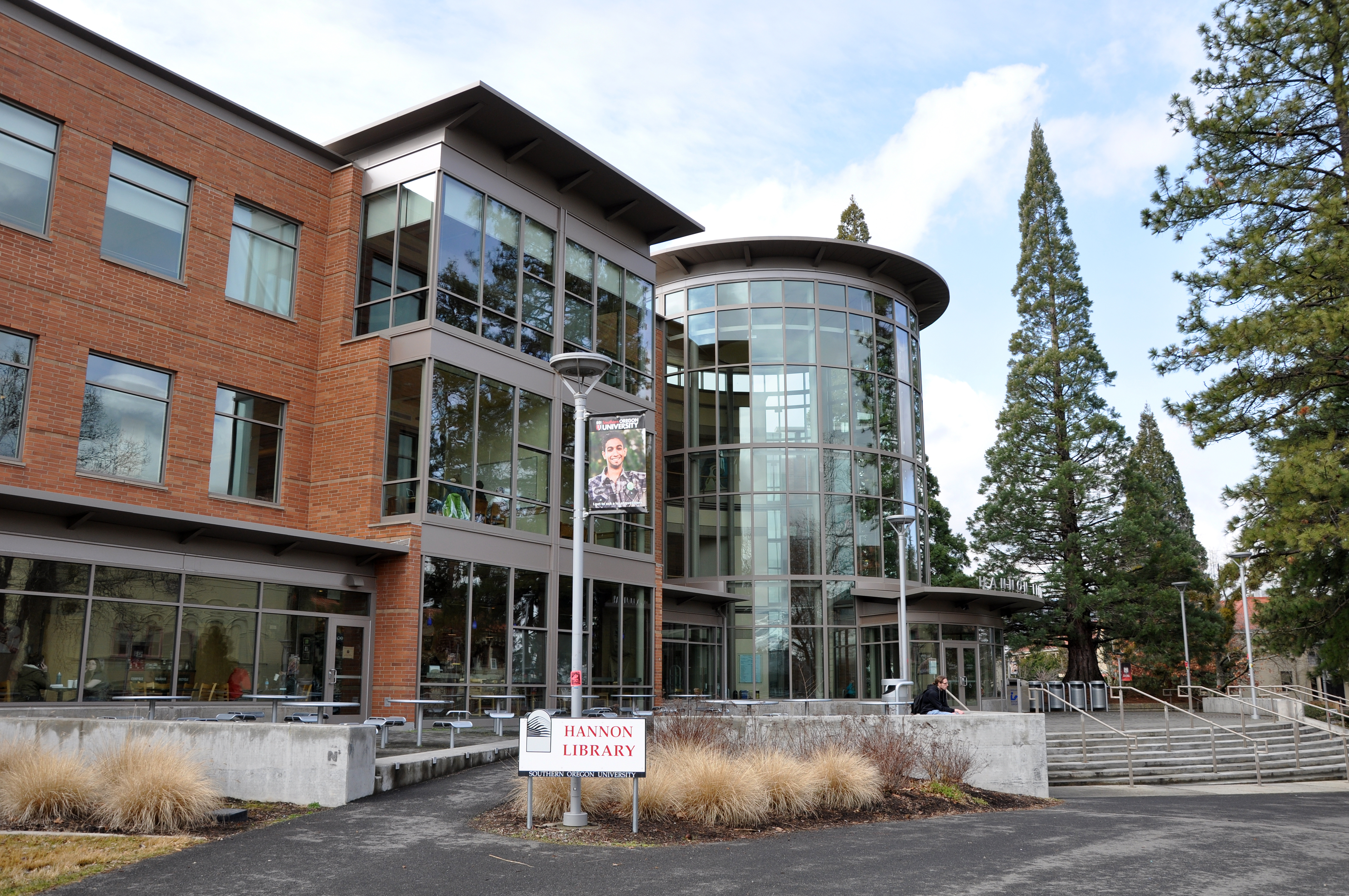
Hannon Library at Southern Oregon University

Southern Oregon University, a public co-ed four-year university founded in 1926, offers courses of study toward degrees in the liberal arts, science, business, and education. With an enrollment of about 4,400 undergraduates as of Fall 2020, this urban university also offers graduate-level programs on its 175-acre (71 ha) campus.

In 2020–21, about 59 percent of the university's students were women, and about 38 percent were men, while 3 percent were listed as other/unknown. The student–faculty ratio in 2020–21 was 19 to 1. Full-time undergraduate tuition in 2020–21 was about $11,000 per year for Oregon residents and $28,000 for non-residents.

The Oregon Extension is a college educational extension program located near Ashland in the Cascade–Siskiyou National Monument.

The Ashland School District oversees three elementary schools, three optional alternative programs for children in kindergarten through eighth grade; one middle school, and Ashland High School.

== Media ==
The Mail Tribune, a newspaper based in Medford that published print editions several days a week, served Ashland until it ceased operations on January 13, 2023. The newspaper also owned the Ashland Daily Tidings, which ran Monday through Saturday until 2019. A non-profit news organization, Ashland News, was founded in 2022 by a former Daily Tidings editor and has two reporters. The Daily Tidings domain name was purchased by an unidentified operator in 2024 who began publishing fake articles created by generative AI using the stolen identities of actual journalists.

Fifteen radio stations operate in the region around Ashland, including Jefferson Public Radio and KSKQ, an independent non-profit broadcasting at 89.5 FM. A former student-run radio station with the call letters KSOC and the nickname "Radio Free Ashland" shut down in February 2013 after 14 years of broadcasting. Rogue Valley Community Television, based at Southern Oregon University, serves Jackson and Josephine counties. Ashland has no commercial television stations, but nearby Medford has seven.

== Infrastructure and public services ==
The Asante Ashland Community Hospital was a general medical and surgical hospital that is part of the Asante health network based in Medford. After restructuring in 2026, it functions as a satellite campus of Rogue Regional Medical Center and essentially a free-standing emergency room with some outpatient services.

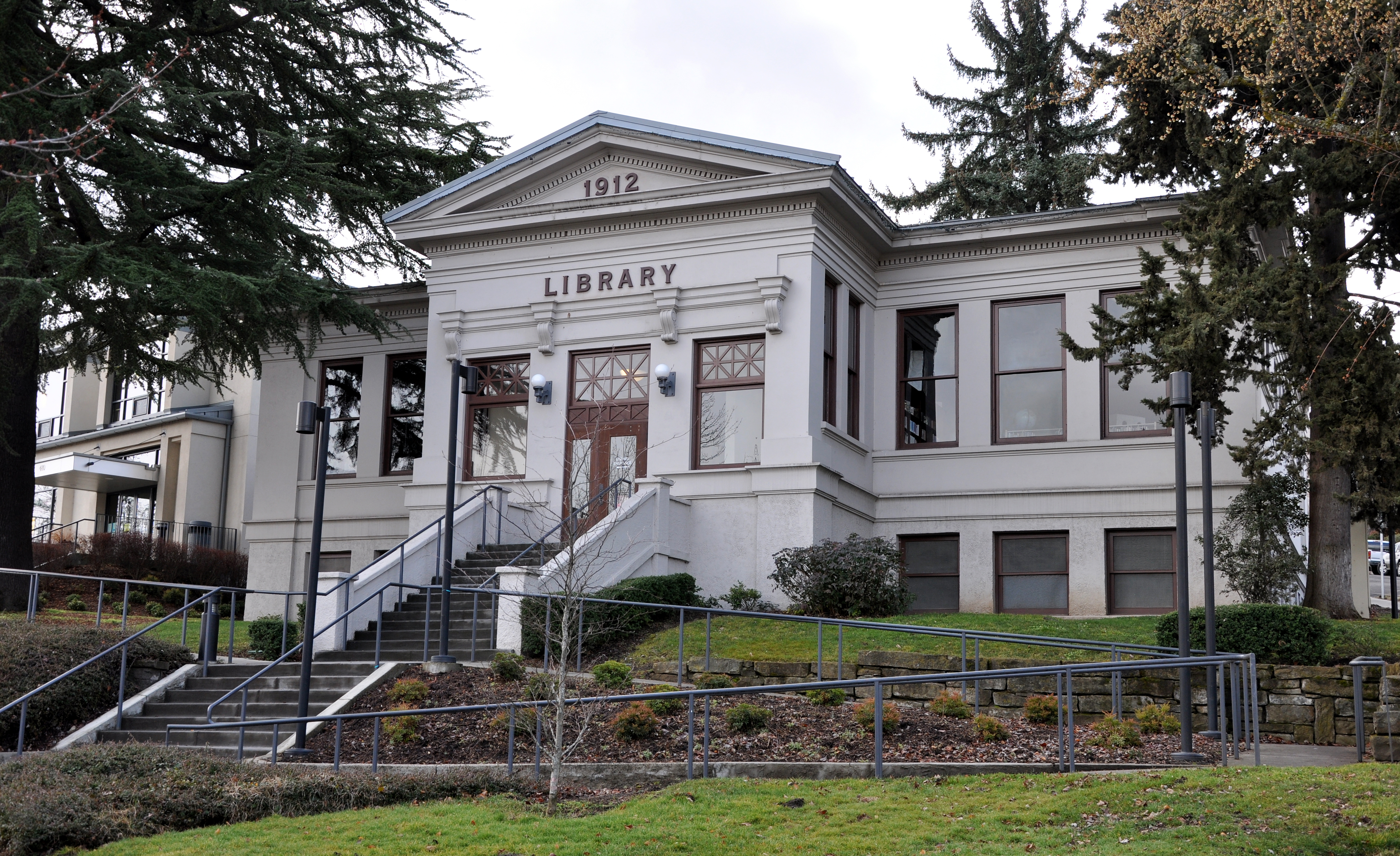
Ashland Public Library

The Ashland Public Library building was expanded from the city's original Carnegie library. In 2003, the historic Carnegie portion of the library was restored. In 2006, budget problems led to the closing in April 2007 of the Ashland Library and 14 others in Jackson County. The event, which lasted until October 2007, was the largest library closure in U.S. history. Although some of its services are handled by a private company, Library Systems and Services, the Ashland branch remains part of the Jackson County network of public libraries.

Rogue Valley Transportation District (RVTD) provides bus service to much of the city, with connections to Medford, Central Point, Talent, Phoenix, White City, and Jacksonville. In Medford, passengers can connect to other regional bus lines, including the Southwest POINT, a daily shuttle carrying passengers between Brookings and the Amtrak station in Klamath Falls. The Klamath Falls Amtrak Station serves the Coast Starlight long-haul passenger train on track owned by the Union Pacific Railroad. Ashland Municipal Airport, with a 3,600-foot (1,100 m) asphalt runway, offers general aviation services. Medford International Airport, 12 miles (19 km) from Ashland, also serves the city.

The City of Ashland moved to improve local broadband Internet access in the late 1990s by creating the Ashland Fiber Network (AFN) and building a fiber optic ring inside the city boundaries. However, by 2006 the city faced difficulties servicing AFN's debt load, which was approaching $15.5 million. The city hired a new AFN director, Joe Franell, who suggested scrapping cable television service while retaining the more profitable high-speed Internet access. In October 2006, the cable television service was transferred to a local company, Ashland Home Net, while the City retained both the infrastructure and the wholesale Internet business.

== In popular culture ==
- The Bakeshop Mystery series by Ellie Alexander, which began with the 2014 publication of Meet Your Baker, is set in Ashland. The heroine of the series owns an artisan bakeshop on the Plaza, and the novels often feature local landmarks and institutions such as Lithia Park, Oregon State University, and the Oregon Shakespeare Festival.
- Coraline is set in a fictionalized version of Ashland. The city was chosen due to its status as home of the Oregon Shakespeare Festival, as Miss Spink and Miss Forcible, two supporting characters in the film, are retired Shakespearean actresses.

== Sister cities ==
Ashland has two sister cities:

- Guanajuato, Mexico
- Sviatohirsk, Ukraine

== Notable people ==
- Harry Anderson (1952–2018), magician and TV actor
- Angelique Ashby (1975−), born in Ashland, California State Senator
- Les AuCoin (1942–), former congressman
- Tai Babilonia (1959–), world champion pairs figure skater
- John Backus (1924–2007), computer scientist who created Fortran
- Dallen Bounds (1971–1999), serial killer
- Angus L. Bowmer (1904–1979), founder of the Oregon Shakespeare Festival
- Erskine Caldwell (1903–1987), author, never lived in Ashland, but is buried there
- Craig Chaquico (1954–), guitarist formerly with Jefferson Starship
- Gretchen Corbett (1947–), actress, debuted as Desdemona at the OSF
- Chad Cota (1971–), former National Football League player
- Catherine E. Coulson (1943–2015), stage and screen actress
- Alex Cox (1954–), film director
- Ann Curry (1956–), former anchor on The Today Show
- Ana Delfosse (1931–2017), Formula One mechanic and driver in Argentina; gas-station operator in Ashland
- Alice DiMicele (1965–), musician
- Jack Elam (1920–2003), actor
- Gordon Fee (1934–2022), American-Canadian theologian
- David Fincher (1962–), film director
- Gloria Greer (1908–1931), actress
- Johnny Gruelle (1880–1938), creator of Raggedy Ann and Raggedy Andy
- Jeremy Guthrie (1979–), pitcher for the Kansas City Royals
- Valerie Harper (1939–2019), actress
- Johnny Harris, journalist and YouTuber
- Anthony Heald (1944–), television, film, and stage actor
- Abel Helman (1824–1910), town founder
- Frank C. High (1875–1966), Medal of Honor recipient for actions during the Philippine–American War
- Gary "Chicken" Hirsh (1940–2021), former drummer for Country Joe and the Fish
- Peter Hollens (1982–), independent a capella singer/songwriter
- Jean Houston (1937–), author, lecturer, known for her work in human potentials, Mystery School and Social Artistry
- Lawson Fusao Inada (1938–), Oregon Poet Laureate 2006–10, Professor Emeritus at Southern Oregon University
- Dean Ing (1931–2020), author
- Forrest Kline (1983–), musician
- Otto Klum (1892–1944), football coach
- Tonya Knight (1966–2023), bodybuilder, actress, model
- Hal Koerner (1976–), ultramarathon runner, two-time winner of the Western States Endurance Run
- Winona LaDuke (1959–), Native American activist and vice-presidential candidate for the Ralph Nader presidential campaign, 2000
- Leonard Levy (1923–2006), Pulitzer Prize-winning historian
- Rose Maddox (1925–1998), country-western musician
- Collin Malcolm (1997–), basketball player for Hapoel Tel Aviv of the Israeli Basketball Premier League
- Steve Mason (1949–2005), "poet laureate" of the Vietnam Veterans of America
- Vladimir Nabokov (1899–1977), author of Lolita
- Mark Parent (1961–), former baseball player and currently bench coach for the Chicago White Sox
- Alfred Peet (1920–2007), founder of Peet's Coffee & Tea
- Jim Perry (1933–2015), television personality
- Bill Rauch (1962–), American theater director; directed the Oregon Shakespeare Festival from 2007 to 2019
- Tucker Reed (1989–), blogger, author, journalist and activist
- Jeff Rense, talk-radio host
- Ron Rezek (1946–), industrial designer and inventor
- Sonny Sixkiller (1951–), former National Football League quarterback
- Jon Micah Sumrall (1980–), lead singer of Christian rock band Kutless
- Jerry Turner (1927–2004), stage designer and director
- Larry Wagner (1907–2002), arranger and composer for Paul Whiteman and the Casa Loma Orchestra
- Neale Donald Walsch (1943–), author of the Conversations with God series
- Henry Woronicz (1954–), actor and director
