= Ashland Creek =

River in Oregon, United States of America

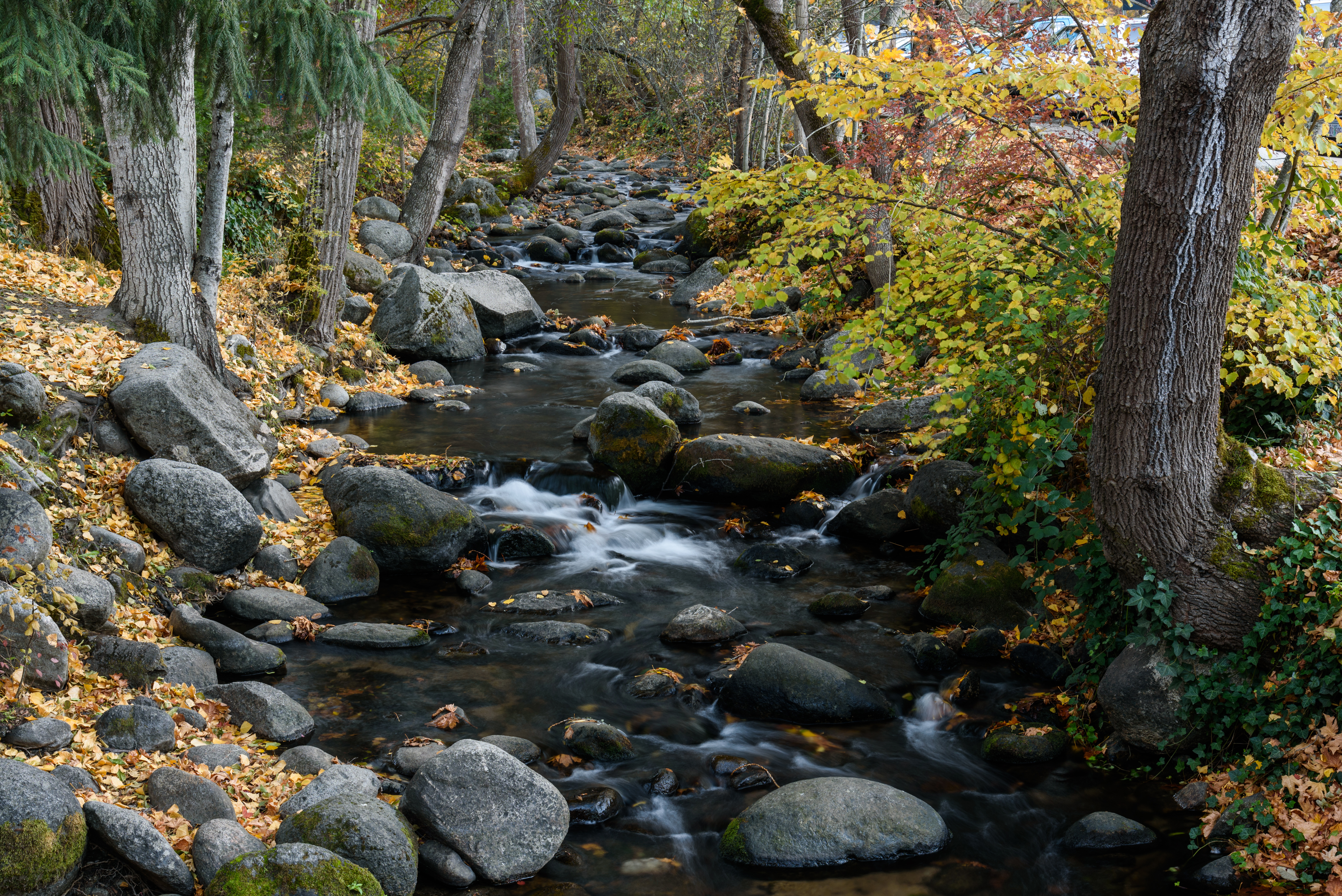
- Flowing through Lithia Park

- Location of the mouth of Ashland Creek in Oregon

Location
- Country: United States
- State: Oregon
- County: Jackson

Physical characteristics
- Source: Mount Ashland
  - location: Reeder Reservoir, Siskiyou Mountains
  - coordinates: 42°09′23″N 122°43′02″W
  - elevation: 2,947 ft (898 m)
- Mouth: Bear Creek
  - location: Ashland
  - coordinates: 42°12′59″N 122°42′49″W
  - elevation: 1,719 ft (524 m)
- Length: 5.4 mi (8.7 km)
- Basin size: 30.6 sq mi (79 km^{2})

Ashland Creek is a 5.4-mile (8.7 km) tributary of Bear Creek in the U.S. state of Oregon. It joins Bear Creek near Ashland, 21 miles (34 km) from the larger stream's confluence with the Rogue River.

The main stem of Ashland Creek begins at Reeder Reservoir, an artificial impoundment of about 20 acres (8.1 ha) that provides municipal water to the city of Ashland. Two tributaries (forks) of the main stem feed the reservoir. Arising on the flanks of Mount Ashland, East Fork Ashland Creek is 5.8 miles (9.3 km) long, and West Fork Ashland Creek is 5.3 miles (8.5 km) long. The forks flow generally north through the Rogue River – Siskiyou National Forest to the reservoir.

Below the reservoir, the main stem continues north through a canyon, then through a channel confined by urban development and into the broad alluvial valley of Bear Creek. The stream gradient averages about 9 percent on the upper reaches and 3 percent within the city.

== Watershed ==
Elevations within the Ashland Creek watershed vary from about 1,700 feet (520 m) at the mouth to about 7,500 feet (2,300 m) in the mountains. The watershed covers about 31 square miles (80 km^{2}) or 20,000 acres. In 2001, this included (rounded to the nearest hundred) 17,100 acres (6,900 ha) of forests; 1,600 acres (650 ha) of city development; 600 acres (240 ha) of rural development; 200 acres (81 ha) of farms, and smaller allotments for other uses. About 75 miles (121 km) of roads crisscrossed the watershed.

== Floods ==
Erosion along the tributaries and upper reaches coupled with rain-on-snow events contribute to sediment transport and floods along Ashland Creek. About 2,000 cubic yards (1,500 m^{3}) of sediment per year accumulates in Reeder Reservoir, but a flood in 1974 deposited 130,000 cubic yards (99,000 m^{3}) quickly, forcing the city to temporarily shut down the municipal water supply. In addition to moving sediment, heavy flows block the creek with woody debris, creating dams that, upon breaking, cause flood surges. Five significant floods, the last in 1997, damaged property in Ashland during the second half of the 20th century. The 1997 rain-on-snow event caused many streams in the Bear Creek watershed to reach 100-year flood levels, resulting in $4.5 million in damages.

== See also ==
- List of rivers of Oregon
