= National Register of Historic Places listings in Jackson County, Oregon =

Location of Jackson County in Oregon

This list presents the full set of buildings, structures, objects, sites, or districts designated on the National Register of Historic Places in Jackson County, Oregon, United States, and offers brief descriptive information about each of them. The National Register recognizes places of national, state, or local historic significance across the United States. Out of over 90,000 National Register sites nationwide, Oregon is home to over 2,000, and 155 of those are found in Jackson County.

This National Park Service list is complete through NPS recent listings posted September 25, 2026.

== Current listings ==
	Name on the Register	Image	Date listed	Location	City or town	Description
1	Nils Ahlstrom House	Nils Ahlstrom House	February 15, 1980 (#80003315)	248 5th St. 42°11′50″N 122°42′21″W	Ashland	
2	Thomas N. Anderson House	Thomas N. Anderson House	June 1, 1990 (#90000845)	719 Second Ave. 42°25′56″N 123°03′06″W	Gold Hill	
3	Antelope Creek Covered Bridge	Antelope Creek Covered Bridge	December 26, 2012 (#12001091)	Little Butte Creek, 35 feet (11 m) east of Main Street; 42°28′20″N 122°48′01″W	Eagle Point	
4	Ashland Cemetery	Ashland Cemetery	June 8, 1995 (#95000687)	Junction of E. Main and Morton Sts. 42°11′37″N 122°42′18″W	Ashland	
5	Ashland Depot Hotel, South Wing	Ashland Depot Hotel, South Wing	February 19, 1991 (#91000047)	624 A St. 42°11′52″N 122°42′20″W	Ashland	
6	Ashland Downtown Historic District	Ashland Downtown Historic District	May 5, 2000 (#00000446)	Roughly bounded by Lithia Way/C St., Church, Lithia Park/Hargadine, and Gresham Sts. 42°11′46″N 122°42′47″W	Ashland	
7	Ashland Masonic Lodge Building	Ashland Masonic Lodge Building	June 4, 1992 (#92000663)	25 N. Main St. 42°11′49″N 122°42′57″W	Ashland	
8	Ashland Municipal Powerhouse	Ashland Municipal Powerhouse	September 10, 1987 (#87001563)	Ashland Creek Canyon; 42°10′09″N 122°42′46″W	Ashland	
9	Ashland Oregon National Guard Armory	Ashland Oregon National Guard Armory	September 10, 1987 (#87001564)	208 Oak St. 42°11′55″N 122°42′48″W	Ashland	
10	Ashland Railroad Addition Historic District	Ashland Railroad Addition Historic District	May 5, 1999 (#99000533)	Roughly bounded by Lithia Way, East Main, Oak St., A St. and 8th Sts. 42°11′48″N 122°42′22″W	Ashland	
11	W. H. Atkinson House	W. H. Atkinson House	October 16, 1979 (#79002063)	125 N. Main St. 42°11′57″N 122°43′02″W	Ashland	
12	Sophenia Ish Baker House	Sophenia Ish Baker House	September 9, 1993 (#93000924)	902 W. McAndrews Rd. 42°19′52″N 122°53′35″W	Medford	
13	Barclay–Klum House	Barclay–Klum House	June 1, 1990 (#90000835)	1023 E. Main St. 42°11′39″N 122°42′04″W	Ashland	
14	Barnum Hotel	Barnum Hotel	March 22, 1984 (#84003009)	204 N. Front St. 42°19′41″N 122°52′28″W	Medford	
15	Baldwin Beach House	Baldwin Beach House	March 28, 1979 (#79002064)	348 Hargadine St. 42°11′39″N 122°42′41″W	Ashland	
16	Robert Vinton Beall House	Robert Vinton Beall House	October 18, 1979 (#79002069)	1253 Beall Lane; 42°21′44″N 122°54′36″W	Central Point	
17	Beeson–Foss Ranch	Beeson–Foss Ranch	January 27, 1999 (#99000067)	6371 Wagner Creek Rd. 42°14′00″N 122°47′30″W	Talent	
18	Big Elk Guard Station	Big Elk Guard Station	December 29, 2000 (#00000462)	FS Rd. 3706 approximately 5 miles (8.0 km) north of Dead Indian Memorial Rd. 42°21′32″N 122°21′28″W	Ashland vicinity	
19	Boslough–Claycomb House	Boslough–Claycomb House	December 9, 1981 (#81000486)	1 Hillcrest St. 42°11′36″N 122°42′46″W	Ashland	
20	Walter Bowne House	Walter Bowne House	February 23, 1990 (#90000279)	1845 Old Stage Rd. 42°20′35″N 122°57′11″W	Jacksonville	
21	BPOE Lodge No. 1168	BPOE Lodge No. 1168	November 28, 1980 (#80003323)	202 N. Central Ave. 42°19′43″N 122°52′25″W	Medford	
22	Britt Gardens Site 35JA789		March 6, 2020 (#100005020)	Address restricted	Jacksonville vicinity	
23	Buckhorn Mineral Springs Resort		March 3, 1989 (#89000064)	2200 Buckhorn Springs Rd. 42°06′20″N 122°31′46″W	Ashland	
24	Victor and Bertha Bursell House	Victor and Bertha Bursell House	April 29, 1982 (#82003725)	3075 Hanley Rd. 42°21′39″N 122°55′49″W	Central Point	
25	Butte Falls Ranger Station	Butte Falls Ranger Station	April 11, 1986 (#86000824)	Rogue River National Forest; 42°32′26″N 122°33′53″W	Butte Falls	
26	Frank E. Bybee House	Frank E. Bybee House	December 9, 1981 (#81000492)	4491 Jacksonville Hwy. 42°19′30″N 122°56′36″W	Jacksonville	
27	William Bybee House	William Bybee House	February 15, 1977 (#77001102)	883 Old Stage Rd. 42°19′45″N 122°57′45″W	Jacksonville	
28	Camp White Station Hospital Administration Building	Camp White Station Hospital Administration Building	December 20, 2016 (#16000881)	8495 Crater Lake Highway; 42°26′27″N 122°50′25″W	White City	
29	Richard Posey Campbell House	Richard Posey Campbell House	February 12, 1980 (#80003316)	94 Bush St. 42°11′58″N 122°43′07″W	Ashland	Also known as Orlando Coolidge Rental House.
30	A. S. V. and Helen Bundy Carpenter House		December 23, 2005 (#05001456)	1677 Old Stage Rd. 42°20′29″N 122°57′40″W	Central Point	
31	E. V. Carter House	E. V. Carter House	March 7, 1979 (#79002065)	505 Siskiyou Blvd. 42°11′37″N 122°42′28″W	Ashland	
32	H. B. Carter House	H. B. Carter House	November 2, 1977 (#77001101)	91 Gresham St. 42°11′35″N 122°42′38″W	Ashland	
33	Carter–Fortmiller House	Carter–Fortmiller House	December 21, 1981 (#81000487)	514 Siskiyou Blvd. 42°11′36″N 122°42′29″W	Ashland	
34	Central Point Public School	Central Point Public School	December 3, 1980 (#80003321)	450 S. 4th St. 42°22′17″N 122°54′39″W	Central Point	
35	Chappell–Swedenburg House	Chappell–Swedenburg House	November 30, 1982 (#82001503)	990 Siskiyou Blvd. 42°11′19″N 122°41′52″W	Ashland	
36	Chavner Family House	Chavner Family House	May 31, 1996 (#96000628)	12162 Blackwell Rd. 42°25′50″N 123°02′03″W	Gold Hill	
37	Citizen's Banking & Trust Co. Building	Citizen's Banking & Trust Co. Building	February 28, 1985 (#85000364)	232–242 E. Main St. 42°11′44″N 122°42′45″W	Ashland	
38	Frank Chamberlain Clark House	Frank Chamberlain Clark House	October 29, 1982 (#82001504)	1917 E. Main St. 42°19′43″N 122°50′49″W	Medford	
39	Cooley–Neff Warehouse	Cooley–Neff Warehouse	September 6, 2007 (#07000923)	340 N. Fir St. 42°19′43″N 122°52′37″W	Medford	
40	Orlando Coolidge House	Orlando Coolidge House	February 12, 1980 (#80003317)	137 N. Main St. 42°11′58″N 122°43′03″W	Ashland	
41	Corning Court Ensemble	Corning Court Ensemble	February 19, 1991 (#91000043)	5–16 Corning Ct. 42°19′39″N 122°51′53″W	Medford	
42	Dead Indian Soda Springs Shelter	Dead Indian Soda Springs Shelter	December 29, 2000 (#00000498)	Near end of S. Fork Little Butte Cr. Rd. 42°20′17″N 122°27′01″W	Eagle Point	
43	E. Raymond Driver House	E. Raymond Driver House	March 9, 1990 (#90000372)	4140 Old Stage Rd. 42°22′39″N 122°57′19″W	Central Point	
44	Patrick Dunn Ranch	Patrick Dunn Ranch	March 8, 1978 (#78002287)	Southeast of Ashland on OR 66; 42°09′56″N 122°38′28″W	Ashland	
45	Dutchman Peak Lookout	Dutchman Peak Lookout	December 29, 2000 (#00000509)	FS Rd. 20 approximately 25 miles (40 km) southwest of Ashland; 42°02′37″N 122°53′23″W	Ashland	
46	Eagle Point National Cemetery	Eagle Point National Cemetery	September 13, 2016 (#16000626)	2763 Riley Road; 42°27′51″N 122°47′12″W	Eagle Point	
47	Eddings–Provost House	Eddings–Provost House	November 6, 1980 (#80003318)	364 Vista St. 42°11′35″N 122°42′40″W	Ashland	
48	Eden Valley Orchard	Eden Valley Orchard	July 14, 2000 (#00000802)	2488 Voorhies Rd. 42°17′19″N 122°50′48″W	Medford	
49	H. Chandler and Alice B. Egan House		February 21, 1997 (#97000126)	2620 Foothill Rd. 42°21′11″N 122°49′21″W	Medford	Champion golfer and noted golf course architect Chandler Egan (1884–1936) designed this house in the Arts and Crafts style when he settled in Oregon. Built in 1911 during Medford's "Orchard Boom", it served both as family residence and headquarters for the surrounding Egan orchard venture.
50	Enders Building	Enders Building	October 23, 1986 (#86002902)	250–300 E. Main St. 42°11′44″N 122°42′44″W	Ashland	
51	Edward Charles Faber House	Edward Charles Faber House	February 21, 1997 (#97000138)	445 Manzanita St. 42°22′37″N 122°54′49″W	Central Point	
52	First Baptist Church	First Baptist Church	March 28, 1979 (#79002066)	241 Hargadine St. 42°11′42″N 122°42′46″W	Ashland	
53	First National Bank, Vaupel Store and Oregon Hotel Buildings	First National Bank, Vaupel Store and Oregon Hotel Buildings	February 29, 1980 (#80003319)	15 S. Pioneer St. and 70 E. Main St. 42°11′48″N 122°42′51″W	Ashland	
54	Fish Lake Shelter	Fish Lake Shelter	December 29, 2000 (#00000503)	Fish Lake, south of Oregon Route 140, approximately 25 miles (40 km) northeast of Ashland; 42°23′37″N 122°19′04″W	Ashland vicinity	
55	Fluhrer Bakery Building	Fluhrer Bakery Building	May 16, 1983 (#83002152)	29 N. Holly St. 42°19′30″N 122°52′36″W	Medford	
56	Fort Lane Military Post Site	Fort Lane Military Post Site	September 20, 1988 (#88001121)	Address restricted	Central Point	
57	Andrew J. Fredenburg House	Andrew J. Fredenburg House	June 17, 1982 (#82003726)	243 S. Holly St. 42°19′21″N 122°52′25″W	Medford	
58	Frederic E. Furry House	Frederic E. Furry House	February 29, 1980 (#80003324)	1720 N. Phoenix Rd. 42°18′19″N 122°49′12″W	Medford	
59	C. E. "Pop" Gates House	C. E. "Pop" Gates House	February 19, 1991 (#91000042)	1307 Queen Anne Ave. 42°19′50″N 122°51′20″W	Medford	
60	Glenview Orchard Ensemble	Glenview Orchard Ensemble	October 23, 1986 (#86002925)	1395 Carpenter Hill Rd. 42°16′46″N 122°52′08″W	Phoenix	
61	Gold Hill High School	Gold Hill High School	February 20, 1991 (#91000046)	806 6th Ave. 42°26′04″N 123°03′17″W	Gold Hill	
62	G. M. and Kate Grainger House	G. M. and Kate Grainger House	February 23, 1990 (#90000289)	35 Granite St. 42°11′50″N 122°43′02″W	Ashland	
63	Edgar F. Hafer House	Edgar F. Hafer House	September 1, 1983 (#83002153)	426 W. 6th St. 42°19′30″N 122°52′42″W	Medford	
64	Michael Hanley Farmstead	Michael Hanley Farmstead	November 25, 1983 (#83004172)	1053 Hanley Rd. 42°20′08″N 122°55′54″W	Medford	
65	Hanscom Hall	Hanscom Hall	June 3, 1996 (#96000626)	201 Talent Ave. 42°14′39″N 122°47′11″W	Talent	Destroyed by fire in 2020.
66	Hargadine Cemetery	Hargadine Cemetery	June 3, 1998 (#98000627)	Sheridan and Walnut Sts. 42°12′35″N 122°43′34″W	Ashland	
67	Charles and Elizabeth Hatch House	Charles and Elizabeth Hatch House	June 23, 2011 (#11000404)	199 1st St. 42°26′07″N 123°10′09″W	Rogue River	
68	Hillcrest Orchard Historic District	Hillcrest Orchard Historic District	February 16, 1984 (#84003013)	3285 Hillcrest Rd. 42°19′53″N 122°49′18″W	Medford	
69	Harry and Eleanor Holmes House		June 22, 2021 (#100006685)	217 S. Modoc Ave. 42°19′29″N 122°50′23″W	Medford	
70	George A. Hover House	George A. Hover House	September 8, 1980 (#80003325)	4192 Coleman Creek Rd. 42°15′49″N 122°50′28″W	Medford	
71	Imnaha Guard Station	Imnaha Guard Station	April 11, 1986 (#86000835)	Rogue River National Forest; 42°42′13″N 122°19′53″W	Butte Falls	
72	IOOF Building	IOOF Building	February 17, 1978 (#78002288)	49–57 N. Main St. 42°11′52″N 122°42′57″W	Ashland	
73	Jackson County Courthouse	Jackson County Courthouse	October 23, 1986 (#86002921)	S. Oakdale Ave. at Eighth St. 42°19′23″N 122°52′40″W	Medford	
74	Jacksonville Historic District	Jacksonville Historic District	November 13, 1966 (#66000950)	Jacksonville city limits 42°18′45″N 122°58′00″W	Jacksonville	Founded in 1852 as a mining town, Jacksonville became the principal financial and commercial center of southern Oregon until it was bypassed by the railroad. The town's unusual state of preservation and completeness make it a uniquely intact example of a mid-19th century inland commercial town.
75	Jacksonville-to-Fort Klamath Military Wagon Road	Jacksonville-to-Fort Klamath Military Wagon Road	May 16, 1979 (#79002068)	South of Butte Falls; 42°28′46″N 122°26′57″W	Butte Falls	
76	E. C. Kane House	E. C. Kane House	November 6, 1986 (#86002964)	386 B St. 42°11′50″N 122°42′33″W	Ashland	
77	Lee-Janouch House		January 30, 2025 (#100011431)	1202 East Main Street; 42°19′40″N 122°51′32″W	Medford	
78	Liberty Building	Liberty Building	March 14, 1978 (#78002292)	201 W. Main St. 42°19′29″N 122°52′30″W	Medford	
79	Lithia Park	Lithia Park	November 22, 1982 (#82001505)	59 Winburn Way; 42°11′36″N 122°43′03″W	Ashland	
80	Lithia Springs Hotel	Lithia Springs Hotel	March 14, 1978 (#78002289)	212 E. Main St. 42°11′45″N 122°42′46″W	Ashland	
81	Lodgepole Guard Station	Lodgepole Guard Station	March 6, 1991 (#91000164)	Butte Falls Ranger District, Rogue River National Forest; 42°39′13″N 122°22′44″W	Butte Falls vicinity	
82	Lost Creek Bridge	Lost Creek Bridge	November 29, 1979 (#79002070)	Southeast of Lake Creek; 42°25′21″N 122°44′56″W	Lake Creek	
83	Robert and Ruth Lucas House and Mary E. Rose House	Robert and Ruth Lucas House and Mary E. Rose House	July 21, 1988 (#88001115)	59, 77 Sixth St. 42°11′41″N 122°42′21″W	Ashland	
84	Madden–McCaskey House	Madden–McCaskey House	January 21, 1994 (#93001506)	3347 Old Stage Rd. 42°21′53″N 122°56′56″W	Central Point	
85	Malmgren Garage		May 9, 2024 (#100010337)	111 Talent Avenue; 42°14′40″N 122°47′12″W	Talent	Gutted by fire in 2020.
86	John McCall House	John McCall House	December 9, 1981 (#81000488)	153 Oak St. 42°11′53″N 122°42′51″W	Ashland	
87	William McCredie House	William McCredie House	September 17, 1980 (#80003326)	2685 Old Stage Rd. 42°21′21″N 122°56′44″W	Central Point	
88	McKee Bridge	McKee Bridge	November 29, 1979 (#79002074)	South of Ruch; 42°07′34″N 123°04′19″W	Ruch	
89	McKee Bridge Campground	McKee Bridge Campground	December 29, 2000 (#00000516)	Upper Applegate Rd. approximately 7 miles (11 km) south of OR 238; 42°07′42″N 123°04′14″W	Jacksonville	
90	Patrick F. McManus House	Patrick F. McManus House	March 8, 1978 (#78002293)	117 W. 1st St. 42°16′23″N 122°48′58″W	Phoenix	
91	Medford Carnegie Library	Medford Carnegie Library	July 30, 1981 (#81000493)	413 W. Main St. 42°19′25″N 122°52′36″W	Medford	
92	Medford Central Firehall	Medford Central Firehall	February 23, 1996 (#96000172)	110 E. 6th St. 42°19′37″N 122°52′25″W	Medford	
93	Medford Downtown Historic District	Medford Downtown Historic District	August 14, 1998 (#98000949)	Roughly between Fourth and Ninth Sts., Oakdale and Riverside Aves. 42°19′36″N 122°52′23″W	Medford	
94	Medford Geneva–Minnesota Historic District	Medford Geneva–Minnesota Historic District	January 21, 1994 (#93001508)	Geneva and Minnesota Sts., from E. Main to Crater Lake Ave. 42°19′46″N 122°51′49″W	Medford	
95	Medford Grocery Company Warehouse	Medford Grocery Company Warehouse	June 20, 2002 (#02000659)	40 E. 10th St. 42°19′24″N 122°52′15″W	Medford	
96	Medford IOOF Cemetery	Medford IOOF Cemetery	March 16, 1989 (#89000205)	Siskiyou Blvd. at Highland Dr. 42°19′16″N 122°51′00″W	Medford	
97	Medford Plaza Apartments	Medford Plaza Apartments	June 16, 2004 (#04000614)	235 S. Oakdale Ave. 42°19′18″N 122°52′31″W	Medford	
98	Medford Southern Pacific Railroad Passenger Depot	Medford Southern Pacific Railroad Passenger Depot	June 3, 1996 (#96000629)	147 N. Front St. 42°19′39″N 122°52′29″W	Medford	
99	John W. Merritt House and Store	John W. Merritt House and Store	March 9, 1992 (#92000129)	117 E. Pine St. 42°22′29″N 122°54′57″W	Central Point	
100	Mountain House	Mountain House	January 21, 2004 (#03001479)	1148 Old Highway 99 South; 42°07′33″N 122°36′30″W	Ashland	
101	Mountain View Cemetery	Mountain View Cemetery	June 8, 1995 (#95000688)	Junction of Normal Ave. and OR 66; 42°11′08″N 122°40′53″W	Ashland	
102	Mt. Stella Lookout		December 29, 2000 (#00000511)	Approximately 2.5 miles (4.0 km) north of Union Cr. 42°56′15″N 122°26′05″W	Prospect	
103	Amos and Vera Nininger House	Amos and Vera Nininger House	October 29, 1982 (#82001506)	80 Hargadine St. 42°11′43″N 122°42′53″W	Ashland	
104	John Orth House	John Orth House	April 11, 1972 (#72001080)	105 W. Main St. 42°18′48″N 122°58′06″W	Jacksonville	
105	Parker Meadows Shelter	Parker Meadows Shelter	December 29, 2000 (#00000466)	Near Forest Rd. 37 approximately 15 miles (24 km) northeast of Butte Falls; 42°36′04″N 122°19′30″W	Butte Falls vicinity	
106	Reginald Parsons Dead Indian Lodge	Reginald Parsons Dead Indian Lodge	June 13, 1997 (#97000588)	4011 Hyatt Prairie Rd. 42°13′34″N 122°24′56″W	Ashland vicinity	
107	Hamilton and Edith Patton House	Hamilton and Edith Patton House	September 9, 1993 (#93000923)	245 Valley View Dr. 42°19′57″N 122°50′35″W	Medford	
108	S. and Sarah J. Pedigrift House	S. and Sarah J. Pedigrift House	February 20, 1992 (#92000063)	407 Scenic Ave. 42°12′13″N 122°43′24″W	Ashland	
109	Peerless Rooms Building	Peerless Rooms Building	October 8, 1992 (#92001328)	243–249 Fourth St. 42°11′51″N 122°42′28″W	Ashland	Also known as Ganiard Building.
110	Emil and Alice Applegate Peil House	Emil and Alice Applegate Peil House	February 20, 1992 (#92000062)	52 Granite St. 42°11′47″N 122°43′01″W	Ashland	
111	John and Charlotte Pelton House	John and Charlotte Pelton House	September 9, 1993 (#93000922)	228 B St. 42°11′51″N 122°42′41″W	Ashland	
112	Domingo Perozzi House	Domingo Perozzi House	February 12, 1980 (#80003320)	88 Granite St. 42°11′44″N 122°43′03″W	Ashland	
113	Dr. E. B. Pickel Rental House	Dr. E. B. Pickel Rental House	October 29, 1982 (#82001507)	815 W. Main St. 42°19′25″N 122°52′52″W	Medford	
114	Humboldt Pracht House	Humboldt Pracht House	December 23, 1981 (#81000489)	234 Vista St. 42°11′39″N 122°42′49″W	Ashland	
115	Prospect Hotel	Prospect Hotel	February 12, 1980 (#80003327)	39 Mill Creek Dr. 42°45′04″N 122°29′12″W	Prospect	Also known by historic name A.H. Boothby House.
116	Putnam–Neff House	Putnam–Neff House	April 25, 2008 (#08000337)	227 N. Berkeley Wy. 42°19′51″N 122°51′01″W	Medford	
117	Alfred Evan Reames House	Alfred Evan Reames House	February 20, 1991 (#91000049)	816 W. 10th St. 42°19′17″N 122°52′48″W	Medford	
118	Dr. John F. and Mary Reddy House	Dr. John F. and Mary Reddy House	September 10, 1987 (#87001538)	122 Oregon Terr. 42°19′49″N 122°51′11″W	Medford	
119	Rich Gulch Diggings	Rich Gulch Diggings	March 23, 2000 (#00000288)	0.75 miles (1.21 km) southwest of Jacksonville; 42°18′33″N 122°58′46″W	Jacksonville	
120	Rock Point Hotel	Rock Point Hotel	September 4, 1980 (#80003322)	40 N. River Rd. 42°25′59″N 123°05′30″W	Gold Hill	
121	Rogue Elk Hotel	Rogue Elk Hotel	February 22, 1980 (#80003329)	27390 OR 62; 42°39′44″N 122°45′25″W	Trail	
122	Root–Banks House	Root–Banks House	August 5, 1994 (#94000807)	11 N. Peach St. 42°19′26″N 122°52′58″W	Medford	
123	Fordyce Roper House – Southern Oregon Hospital	Fordyce Roper House – Southern Oregon Hospital	December 2, 1985 (#85003075)	35 S. Second St. 42°11′41″N 122°42′44″W	Ashland	
124	Schuler Apartment Building	Schuler Apartment Building	June 19, 1991 (#91000800)	38 N. Oakdale Ave. 42°19′28″N 122°52′41″W	Medford	
125	Shone–Charley House	Shone–Charley House	October 25, 1984 (#84000131)	305 N. Grape St. 42°19′39″N 122°52′40″W	Medford	
126	Col. William H. Silsby House	Col. William H. Silsby House	February 28, 1985 (#85000365)	111 3rd St. 42°11′47″N 122°42′35″W	Ashland	
127	Siskiyou–Hargadine Historic District	Siskiyou–Hargadine Historic District	September 14, 2002 (#02001008)	Roughly bounded by East Main, Morse, Beach, Iowa, and Pioneer Sts. 42°11′30″N 122°42′25″W	Ashland	
128	Skidmore Academy Historic District	Skidmore Academy Historic District	August 14, 2001 (#01000832)	Roughly bounded by the railroad right-of-way, Granite, Scenic, and Maple Sts. 42°11′59″N 122°43′04″W	Ashland	
129	Snowy Butte Flour Mill	Snowy Butte Flour Mill	September 1, 1976 (#76001581)	402 N. Royal Avenue; 42°28′27″N 122°47′54″W	Eagle Point	Damaged severely by fire, Christmas Day 2015. The Butte Creek Foundation is nearing completion of a historically-based restoration that will return the mill to operation, with the original Buhr stones and gearing, in 2020.
130	South Oakdale Historic District	South Oakdale Historic District	March 15, 1979 (#79002072)	Irregular pattern along S. Oakdale Ave. from Stewart Ave. to W. 10th St. 42°18′58″N 122°52′28″W	Medford	Development of this well-preserved residential neighborhood began in 1890 and continued until around 1940. It became one of the city's grand neighborhoods, with many residents prominent in Medford. The district exhibits a wide range of architectural styles, notably including several works by Frank Chamberlain Clark.
131	Sparta Building	Sparta Building	October 8, 1992 (#92001329)	12 N. Riverside Ave. 42°19′40″N 122°52′14″W	Medford	
132	Squaw Peak Lookout	Squaw Peak Lookout	December 29, 2000 (#00000512)	Approximately 8 miles (13 km) south of FS Rd. 20, 25 miles (40 km) south of Jacksonville; 42°04′10″N 123°00′40″W	Jacksonville vicinity	
133	Star Ranger Station	Star Ranger Station	March 6, 1991 (#91000168)	East of Applegate R., Rogue R. NF; 42°09′02″N 123°03′31″W	Ruch	
134	Star Ranger Station Building, Old	Star Ranger Station Building, Old	December 29, 2000 (#00000460)	6941 Upper Applegate Rd. 42°09′01″N 123°03′29″W	Jacksonville	
135	Dr. Charles T. and Mary Sweeney House	Dr. Charles T. and Mary Sweeney House	June 4, 1992 (#92000664)	2336 Table Rock Rd. 42°21′09″N 122°53′02″W	Medford	
136	Talent Elementary School	Talent Elementary School	March 7, 2012 (#12000080)	206 Main Street; 42°14′41″N 122°47′18″W	Talent	
137	George Taverner House	George Taverner House	November 7, 1978 (#78002290)	912 Siskiyou Blvd. 42°11′20″N 122°41′58″W	Ashland	
138	Tayler–Phipps Building	Tayler–Phipps Building	February 23, 1990 (#90000280)	221–225 E. Main St. 42°19′37″N 122°52′19″W	Medford	
139	Trinity Episcopal Church	Trinity Episcopal Church	April 5, 1984 (#84003015)	44 N. 2nd St. 42°11′45″N 122°42′38″W	Ashland	
140	U.S. Post Office and Courthouse	U.S. Post Office and Courthouse	April 30, 1979 (#79002073)	310 W. 6th St. 42°19′32″N 122°52′38″W	Medford	
141	Union Creek Historic District	Union Creek Historic District	October 29, 1980 (#80003328)	Oregon Route 62; 42°54′26″N 122°26′41″W	Prospect vicinity	
142	Henry Van Hoevenberg Jr. House	Henry Van Hoevenberg Jr. House	December 10, 1981 (#81000491)	9130 Ramsey Canyon Rd. 42°30′19″N 122°59′41″W	Gold Hill	
143	Wagner Creek School	Wagner Creek School	October 8, 1992 (#92001331)	8448 Wagner Creek Rd. 42°12′44″N 122°47′31″W	Talent	
144	John P. Walker House	John P. Walker House	March 14, 1978 (#78002291)	1521 E. Main St. 42°11′45″N 122°41′22″W	Ashland	
145	Washington Elementary School	Washington Elementary School	October 31, 2012 (#12000899)	610 S. Peach St. 42°19′02″N 122°52′58″W	Medford	
146	Mathias Welch House	Mathias Welch House	June 4, 1998 (#98000625)	162 N. Second St. 42°22′35″N 122°54′59″W	Central Point	
147	West Side Feed and Sale Stable	West Side Feed and Sale Stable	December 21, 1981 (#81000494)	29 S. Grape St. 42°19′29″N 122°52′28″W	Medford	
148	John B. White House	John B. White House	November 2, 1978 (#78002294)	86 N. River Rd. 42°25′59″N 123°05′32″W	Gold Hill	
149	Harry L. Whited House	Harry L. Whited House	June 3, 1998 (#98000626)	321 N. Main St. 42°12′09″N 122°43′11″W	Ashland	
150	Whittle Garage Building	Whittle Garage Building	March 7, 1997 (#97000142)	101 Oak St. 42°11′51″N 122°42′52″W	Ashland	
151	Wilkinson–Swem Building	Wilkinson–Swem Building	August 26, 1982 (#82003727)	217 E. Main St. 42°19′37″N 122°52′19″W	Medford	
152	Willow Prairie Cabin	Willow Prairie Cabin	December 29, 2000 (#00000469)	FS Rd. 37 approximately 1.5 miles (2.4 km) north of Butte Falls; 42°24′23″N 122°23′30″W	Butte Falls	
153	Women's Civic Improvement Clubhouse	Women's Civic Improvement Clubhouse	June 16, 1989 (#89000513)	59 Winburn Way; 42°11′45″N 122°43′00″W	Ashland	
154	Isaac Woolen House	Isaac Woolen House	October 16, 1979 (#79002067)	131 N. Main St. 42°11′58″N 122°43′02″W	Ashland	
155	Wrangle Gap Shelter	Wrangle Gap Shelter	December 29, 2000 (#00000505)	FS Rd. 20 approximately 25 miles (40 km) southwest of Ashland; 42°03′02″N 122°51′18″W	Ashland	

== Former listings ==
	Name on the Register	Image	Date listed	Date removed	Location	City or town	Description
1	David N. Birdseye House	David N. Birdseye House	May 1, 1974 (#74001688)	August 5, 1991	U.S. 99, S of Rogue River	Rogue River vicinity	Destroyed by fire in 1990. Rebuilt using original plans and construction methods.
2	Cargill Court Apartments		June 14, 1990 (#90000836)	January 10, 1994	331 W 6th St.	Medford	
3	Samuel Colver House		October 25, 1990 (#90001596)	April 15, 2009	150 Main St. 42°16′17″N 122°48′42″W	Phoenix	Home of settler Samuel Colver. A fire destroyed the building on September 15, 2008.
4	Conro Fiero House	Conro Fiero House	December 9, 1981 (#81000490)	June 1, 2011	4615 Hamrick Road; 42°23′01″N 122°53′34″W	Central Point	Known as the Mon Desir restaurant when destroyed by fire January 10, 2010
5	Medford Hotel	Medford Hotel	June 6, 1985 (#85001180)	December 5, 1988	406 W. Main St.	Medford	Destroyed by fire August 8, 1988.
6	Wimer Bridge	Wimer Bridge	November 29, 1979 (#79002075)	April 18, 2006	E. Evans Creek Rd; 42°32′17″N 123°08′59″W	Wimer	The first bridge over Evans Creek in Wimer was built at this location in 1892, then replaced with a new covered bridge in 1927. The 1927 bridge collapsed in 2003 due to traffic load. A third, replica bridge was built in 2008.

== See also ==
- National Register of Historic Places listings in Oregon
- Listings in neighboring counties: Douglas, Josephine, Klamath, Siskiyou
- List of National Historic Landmarks in Oregon
- Historic preservation
- History of Oregon
- Lists of Oregon-related topics
