= Women's Civic Improvement Club =

Women's Civic Improvement Club or Women's Civic Improvement Clubhouse may refer to:

- Women's Civic Improvement Club of Sacramento, Inc., Sacramento, California, which honored Kathryn C. Lee
- Women's Civic Improvement Clubhouse (Ashland, Oregon)
