= National Register of Historic Places listings in Oregon =

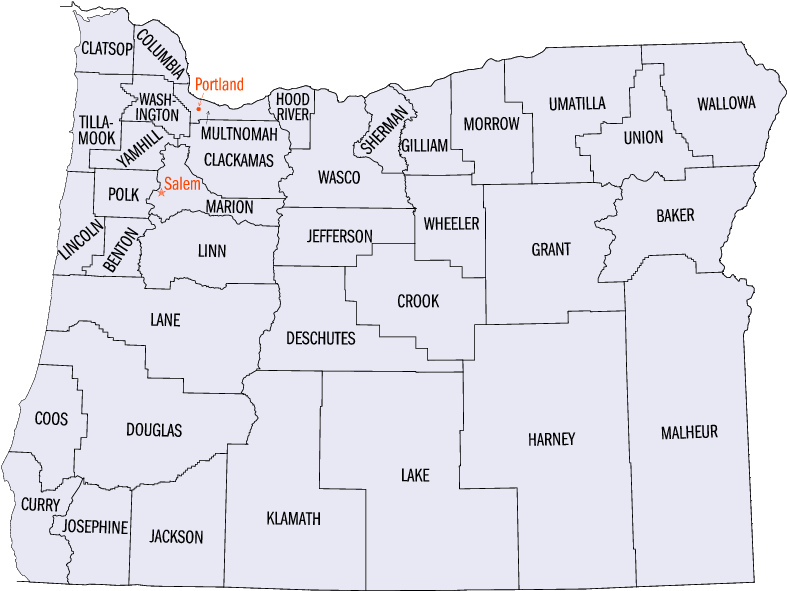
Click on a county to go to a list of National Register sites there.

This is a list of properties and historic districts in Oregon that are listed on the National Register of Historic Places. There are listings in all of Oregon's 36 counties.

The National Register of Historic Places recognizes buildings, structures, objects, sites, and districts of national, state, or local historic significance across the United States. Out of over 90,000 National Register sites nationwide, Oregon is home to more than 2,000 NRHP listings.

Over one-fourth of the NRHP listings in the state are found in Multnomah County. In turn, the large majority (over 90%) of Multnomah's NRHP sites are situated within the city of Portland.

This National Park Service list is complete through NPS recent listings posted October 9, 2026.

== Current listings by county ==
The following are approximate tallies of current listings by county. (Note: These counts are based on entries in the National Register Information Database as of April 24, 2008 and new weekly listings posted since then on the National Register of Historic Places web site. There are frequent additions to the listings and occasional delistings and the counts here are approximate and not official. New entries are added to the official Register on a weekly basis. Also, the counts in this table exclude boundary increase and decrease listings which only modify the area covered by an existing property or district, although such increases and decreases carry a separate National Register reference number.)

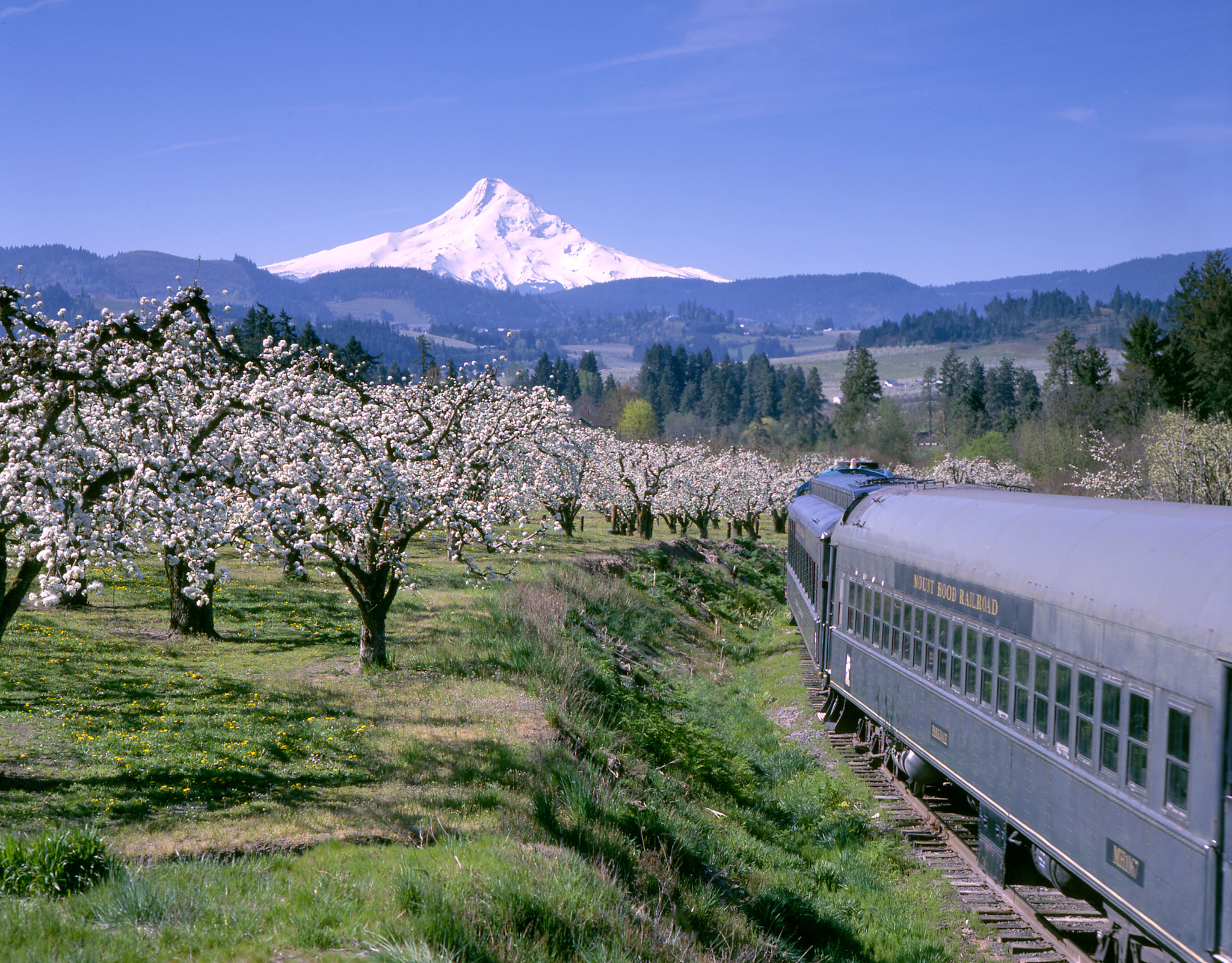
Mount Hood Railroad Hood River County

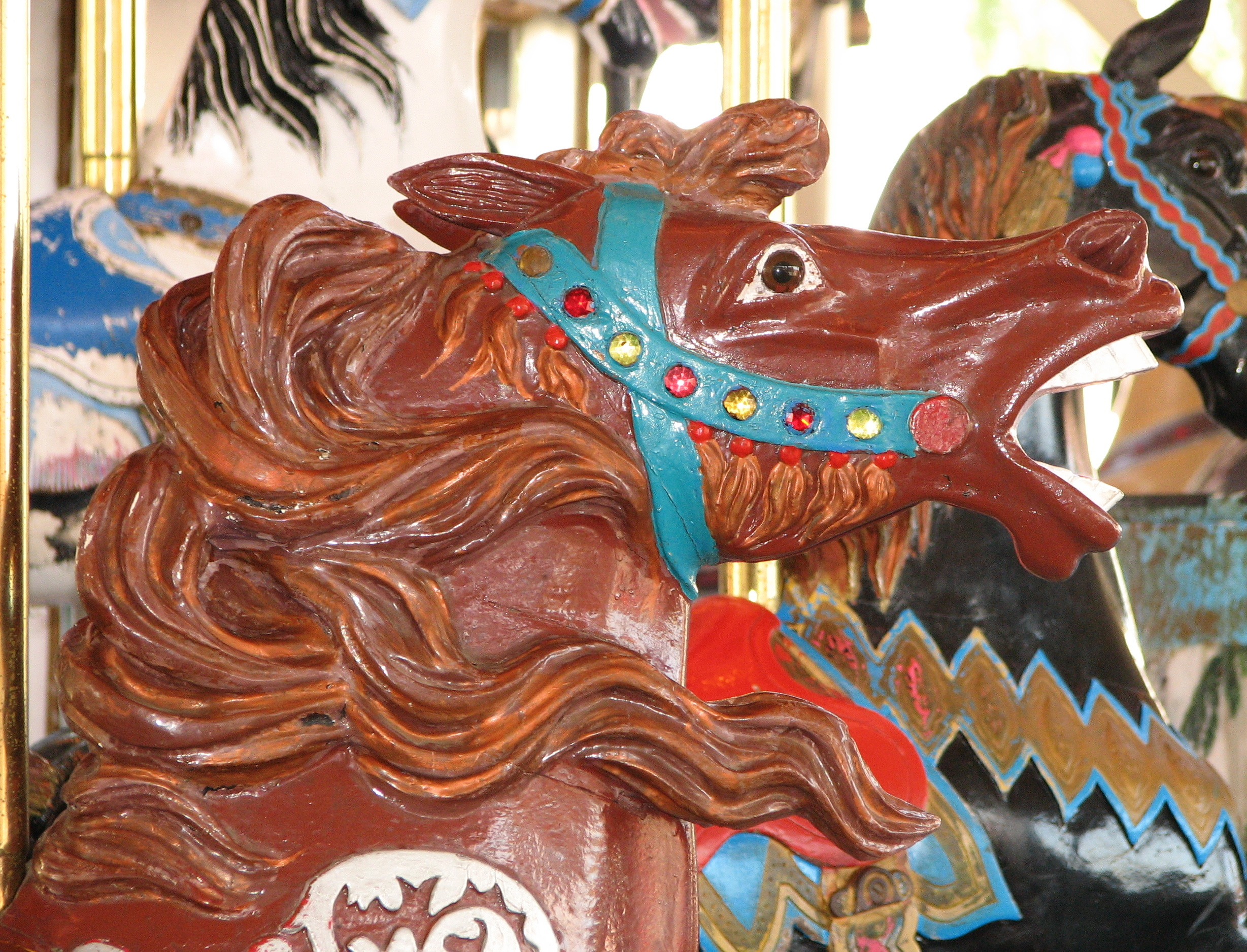
Herschell–Spillman Noah's Ark Carousel Multnomah County

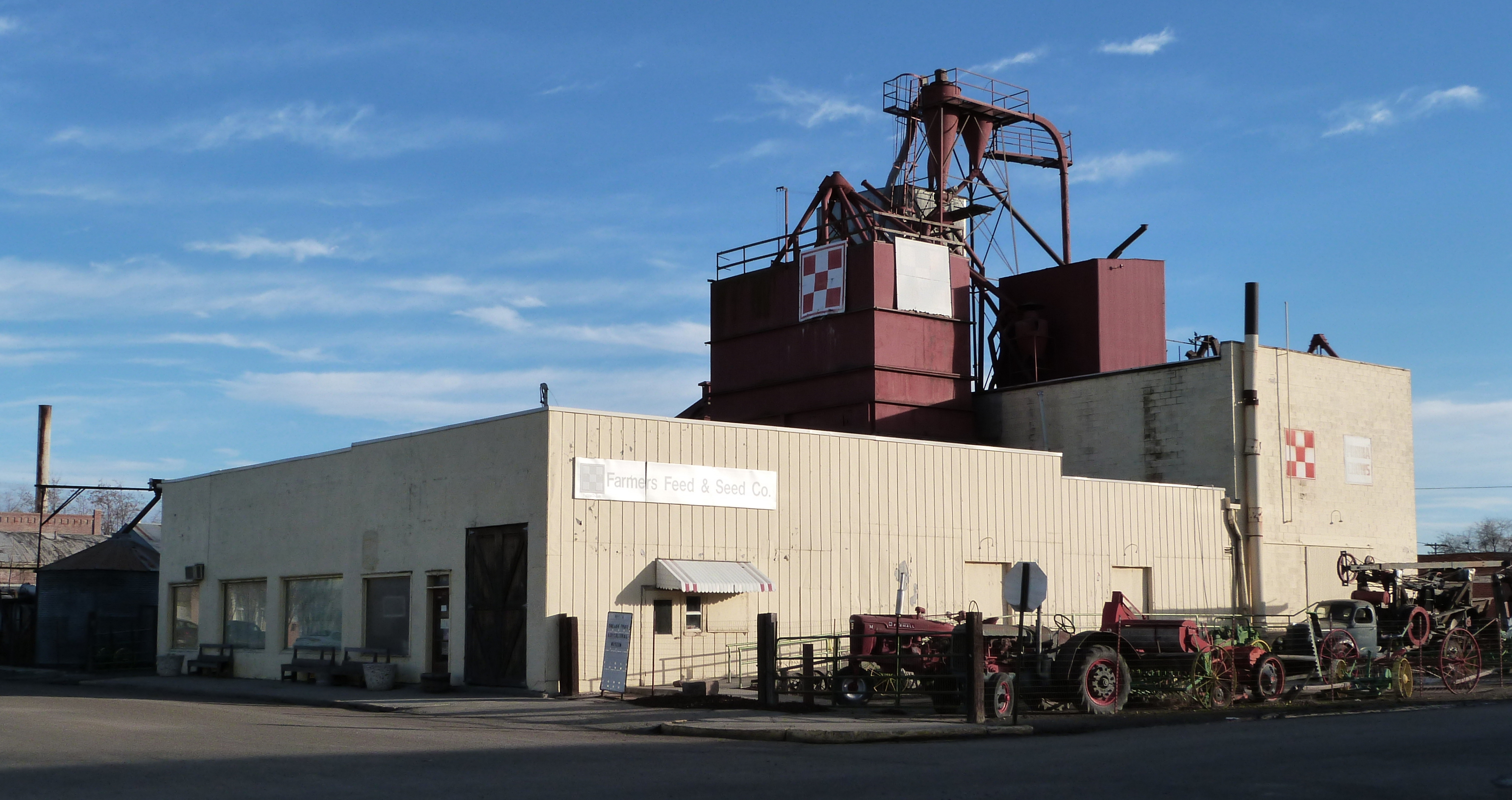
Al Thompson & Son's Feed & Seed Co. Malheur County

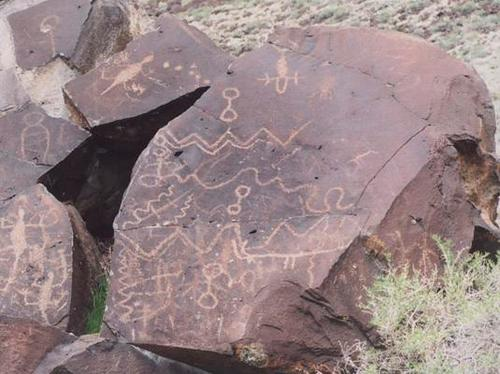
Greaser Petroglyph Site Lake County

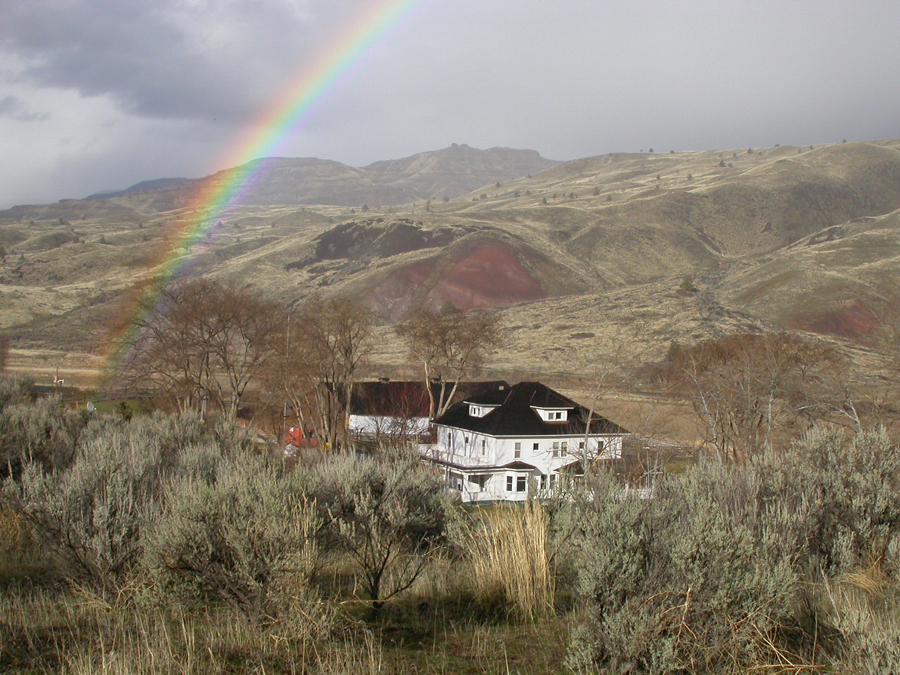
James Cant Ranch Grant County

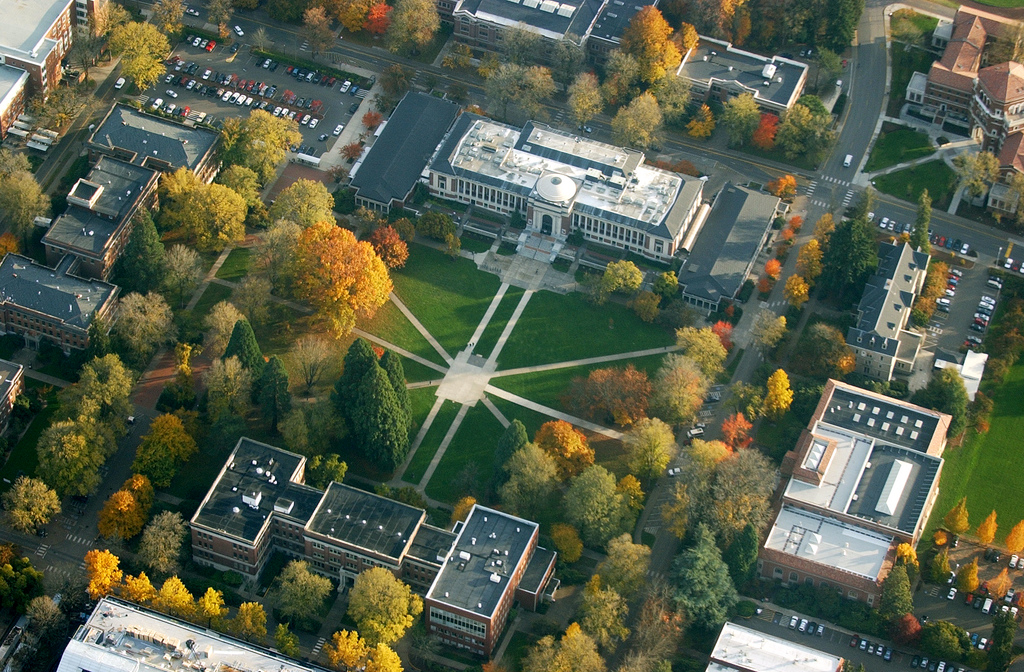
Oregon State University Historic District Benton County

| | County | # of Listings |
|---|---|---|
| 1 | Baker | 13 |
| 2 | Benton | 57 |
| 3 | Clackamas | 92 |
| 4 | Clatsop | 62 |
| 5 | Columbia | 13 |
| 6 | Coos | 55 |
| 7 | Crook | 6 |
| 8 | Curry | 47 |
| 9 | Deschutes | 47 |
| 10 | Douglas | 52 |
| 11 | Gilliam | 3 |
| 12 | Grant | 9 |
| 13 | Harney | 7 |
| 14 | Hood River | 37 |
| 15 | Jackson | 155 |
| 16 | Jefferson | 9 |
| 17 | Josephine | 60 |
| 18 | Klamath | 30 |
| 19 | Lake | 20 |
| 20 | Lane | 138 |
| 21 | Lincoln | 35 |
| 22 | Linn | 76 |
| 23 | Malheur | 19 |
| 24 | Marion | 120 |
| 25 | Morrow | 5 |
| 26.1 | Multnomah: North Portland | 35 |
| 26.2 | Multnomah: Northeast Portland | 93 |
| 26.3 | Multnomah: Northwest Portland | 137 |
| 26.4 | Multnomah: Southeast Portland | 112 |
| 26.5 | Multnomah: South and Southwest Portland | 229 |
| 26.6 | Multnomah: Other | 40 |
| 26.7 | Multnomah: Duplicates | (8) (Note: Several historic resources within Multnomah County are included on multiple area lists: Portland Skidmore/Old Town Historic District: Northwest and Southwest Portland; Laurelhurst Historic District: Northeast and Southeast Portland; Broadway Bridge: North and Northwest Portland; Burnside Bridge: Northeast, Northwest, Southeast, and Southwest Portland; Morrison Bridge: Southeast and Southwest Portland; Hawthorne Bridge: Southeast and Southwest Portland) |
| 26.8 | Multnomah: Total | 638 |
| 27 | Polk | 35 |
| 28 | Sherman | 5 |
| 29 | Tillamook | 30 |
| 30 | Umatilla | 44 |
| 31 | Union | 22 |
| 32 | Wallowa | 23 |
| 33 | Wasco | 35 |
| 34 | Washington | 51 |
| 35 | Wheeler | 2 |
| 36 | Yamhill | 86 |
| (duplicates) | | (14) (Note: Several historic resources in Oregon, mostly of a linear nature, are included on multiple county lists: Barlow Road: Clackamas, Hood River, and Wasco; Columbia River Highway Historic District: Hood River, Multnomah, and Wasco; Jacksonville-to-Fort Klamath Military Wagon Road: Jackson and Klamath; McKenzie Highway Historic District: Deschutes, Lane, and Linn; Mill City Southern Pacific Rail Road (SPRR) Bridge: Linn and Marion; Oregon Pacific Railroad Linear Historic District: Jefferson, Linn, and Marion; Santiam Wagon Road: Deschutes and Linn; Sumpter Valley Railway Historic District: Baker and Grant; Union Street Railroad Bridge and Trestle: Marion and Polk; Willamette National Cemetery: Clackamas and Multnomah) |
| Total: | | 2,124 |

Distribution of listings by county, September 2014.

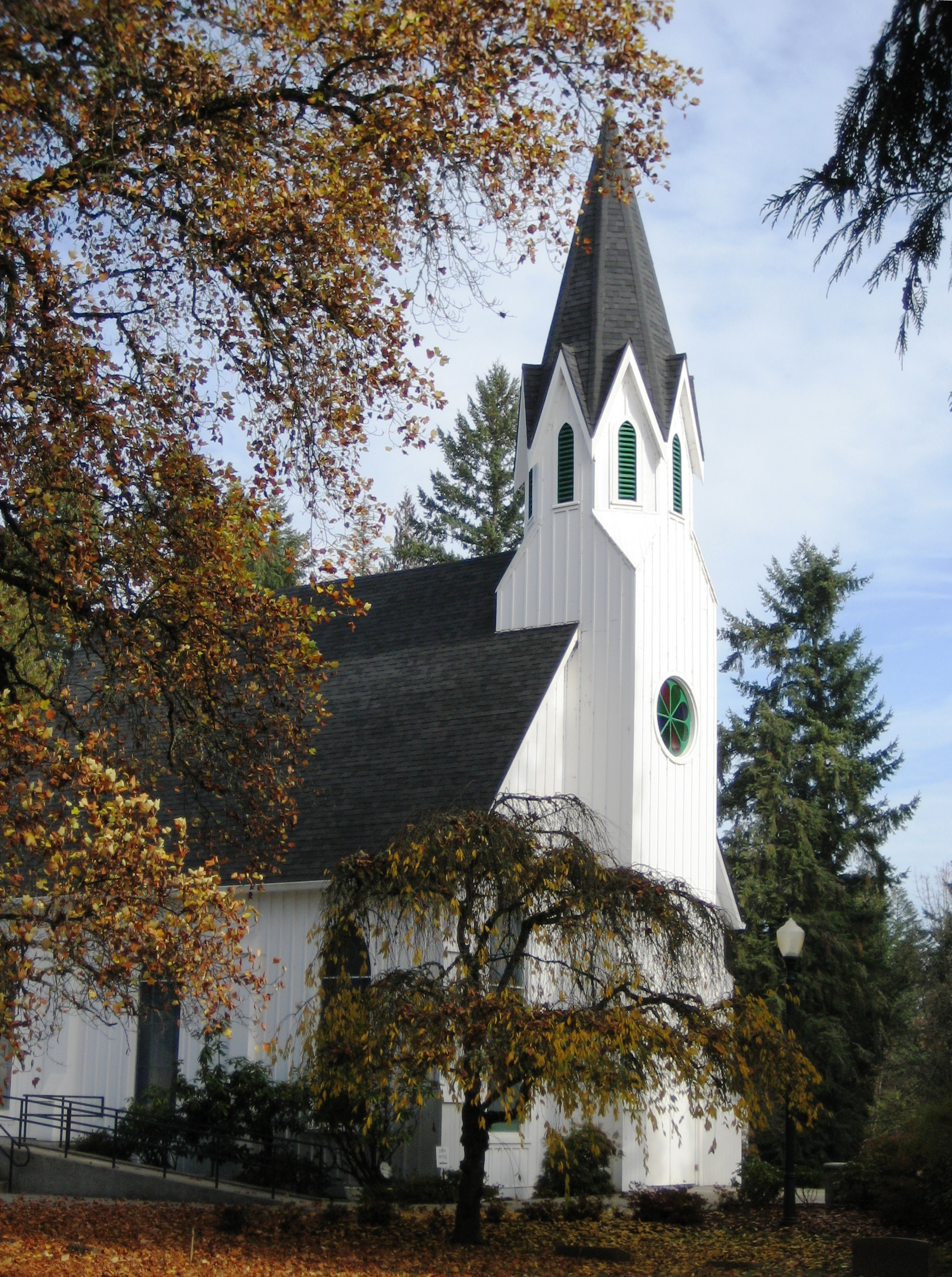
Old Scotch Church Washington County

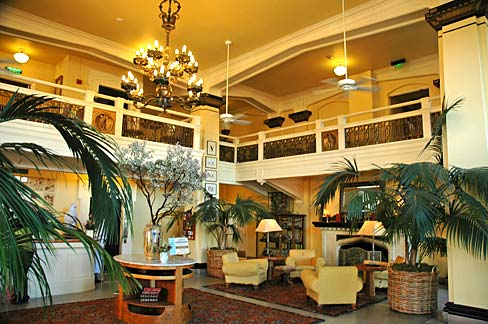
Ashland Springs Hotel Jackson County

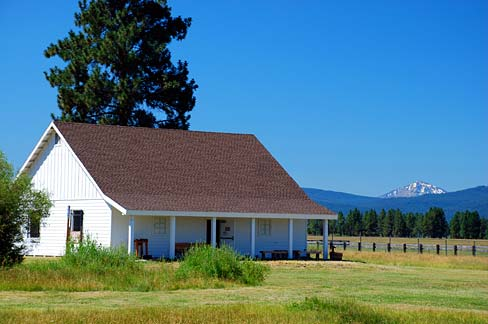
Fort Klamath Site Klamath County

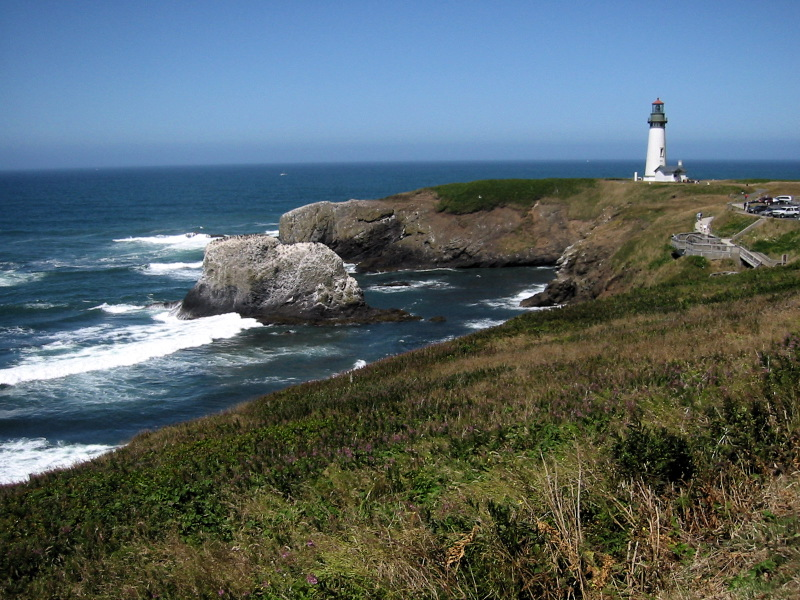
Yaquina Head Lighthouse Lincoln County

== See also ==
- Historic preservation
- History of Oregon
- National Register of Historic Places
- List of historical societies in Oregon
- List of National Historic Landmarks in Oregon
- Lists of Oregon-related topics
