= William H. Lee (publisher) =

African-American newspaper publisher (1936–2019)

William H. Lee (May 29, 1936 – September 22, 2019) was an American newspaper publisher and founder of The Sacramento Observer.

Lee was born to Charles R. Lee and Carrie Lee in Austin, Texas, on May 29, 1936. The Lee family moved to San Francisco, then to Sacramento, California, in the early 1940s. William Lee graduated from Grant High School, attended Sacramento State University from 1953 to 1955, then attended the University of California, Berkeley, where he earned a B.A. degree in accounting in 1957. After working for Aerojet and IBM, Lee founded a real estate and land development firm in 1960.

With radioman Geno Gladden and businessman John W. Cole in 1962, Lee co-founded the The Sacramento Observer, the Black newspaper of Sacramento. By 1965, Lee and his wife Kathryn Lee became sole owners of the newspaper. They started Lee Publishing Company, which at its peak published six papers across two states. Under his leadership, the Observer was named the top Black newspaper in the country by the National Newspaper Publishers Association on six occasions. He was also named a board member of the association from 1970 to 1973.

Lee, then serving as the publisher emeritus of the newspaper, died on September 22, 2019. His son Larry Lee remains publisher of the Observer as of 2026.
