= Medford station (disambiguation) =

Medford station is a Long Island Rail Road station in New York.

Medford station may also refer to:

- Medford station (Oregon), last served in 1955
- Medford/Tufts station, Massachusetts, on the Green Line
- West Medford station, Massachusetts, on the Lowell Line

== See also ==
- Metford railway station, New South Wales, Australia
