= Butte Falls Ranger Station =

- U.S. National Register of Historic Places
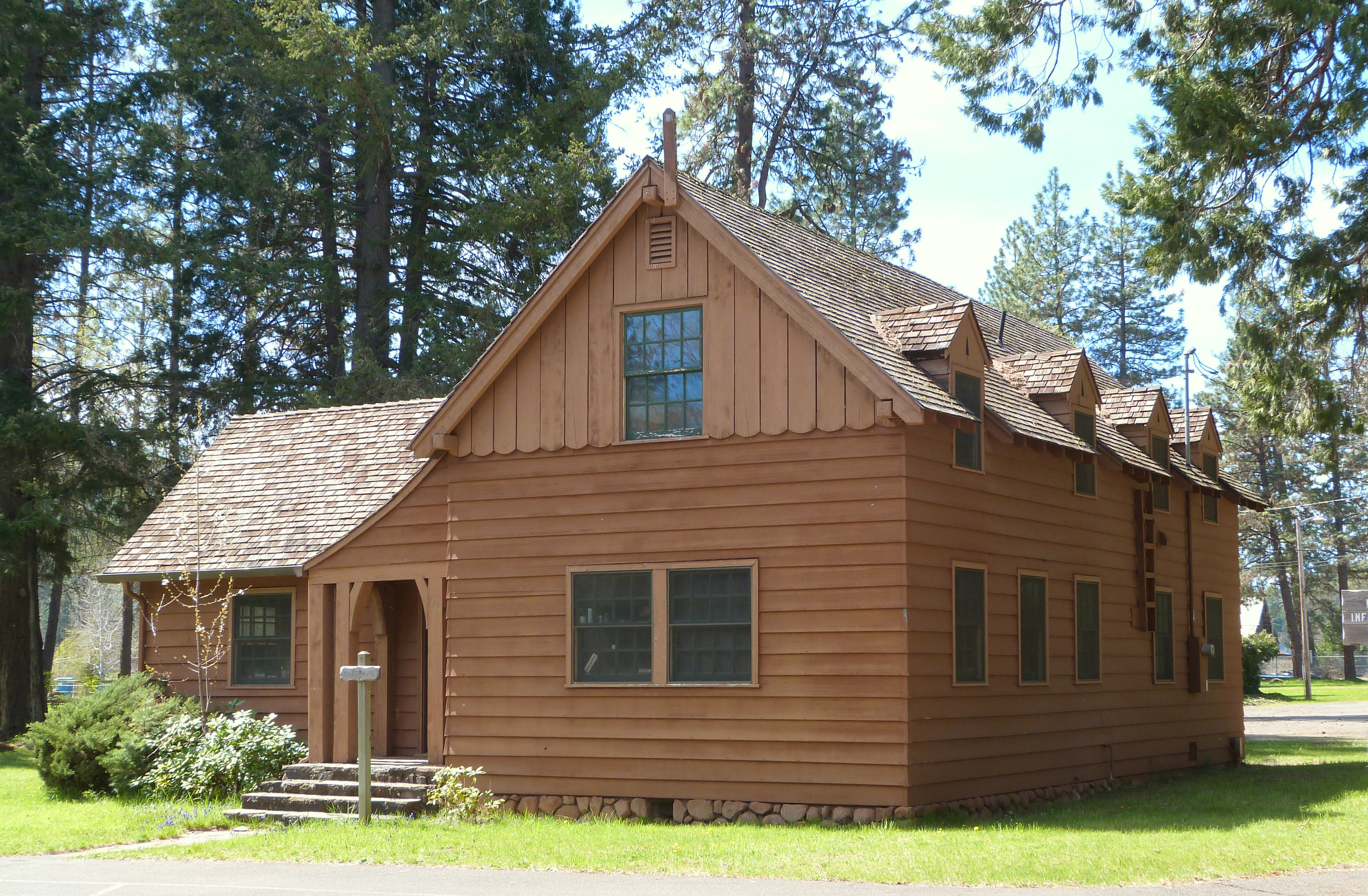
- The historic station office built in 1938 (building # 2002) at the Butte Falls Ranger Station in Butte Falls, Oregon.

- Location within Oregon Location within the United States
- Location: Rogue River National Forest, Butte Falls, Oregon
- Coordinates: 42°32′28″N 122°33′48″W
- Area: 6.1 acres (2.5 ha)
- Built: 1935
- Built by: Civilian Conservation Corps
- Architect: USDA Forest Service
- Architectural style: Rustic
- MPS: Depression-Era Buildings TR
- NRHP reference No.: 86000824
- Added to NRHP: April 11, 1986

The Butte Falls Ranger Station, located in Rogue River – Siskiyou National Forest in Butte Falls, Oregon, was built in 1935 by the Civilian Conservation Corps. It was designed by architects of the United States Forest Service in rustic style.

It was listed on the National Register of Historic Places in 1986 for its architecture. The listing included eight contributing buildings on 6.1 acres (2.5 ha).

It includes the 1938-built station building, a 1 1/2-story building on a concrete foundation with a wood-shingle roof. It includes a pine tree shaped cutout in the east and south gable ends of the roof, and a knotty pine interior.

The Ranger's Residence building was built in 1936.

Butte Falls Ranger Station, Ranger's Residence Garage also includes pine tree cutouts under the roof apex at east and west gable ends.

The Butte Falls Ranger Station, Residence #1001 was built in 1935.

== See also ==
- Big Butte Creek Falls
