= Imnaha Guard Station =

- U.S. National Register of Historic Places
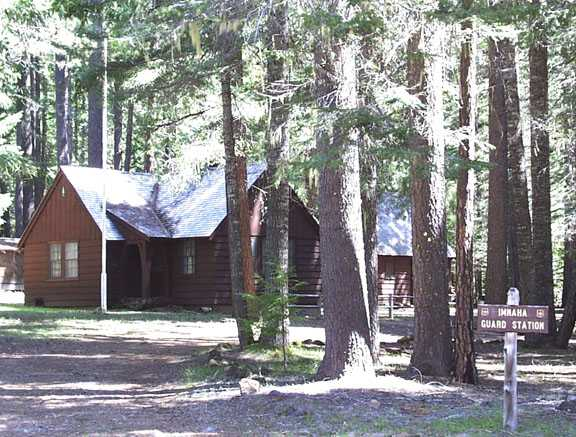
- Location: Rogue River-Siskiyou National Forest
- Nearest city: Butte Falls, Oregon
- Coordinates: 42.70417°N 122.33083°W
- Area: 1 acre (0.40 ha)
- Built: 1939
- Architect: U.S. Forest Service
- Architectural style: Rustic forest cabin
- MPS: Depression-Era Buildings TR
- NRHP reference No.: 86000835
- Added to NRHP: April 11, 1986

The Imnaha Guard Station is a rustic cabin located in the Rogue River-Siskiyou National Forest in western Oregon, United States. It was originally built to house fire crews assigned to patrol the surrounding National Forest. In the 1990s, the United States Forest Service began renting the Imnaha Guard Station to recreational visitors. The Imnaha Guard Station is listed on the National Register of Historic Places.

== History ==
In the 1920s and 1930s, Forest Service employees often traveled many miles from local ranger stations to forest work sites. Since the forest road networks were not well developed, getting to a job site meant a long trek, carrying all the equipment needed to perform the field work. This made it impractical for employees to make daily roundtrips. To facilitate work at remote sites, the Forest Service built guard stations at strategic locations throughout the forest to house fire patrols and project crews.

After World War II, the Forest Service greatly expanded its road network, allowing employees to get to most National Forest areas within a few hours. As a result, guard stations lost their utility. The Forest Service found new uses for some stations, but most were demolished or abandoned. In the 1990s, historic preservation groups with the support of Forest Service employees began pressing National Forest managers to preserve the remaining structures. To finance the preservation effort, the Forest Service started renting guard stations and unused fire lookouts to the public.

The Imnaha Guard Station is located in the Rogue River-Siskiyou National Forest between Butte Falls, Oregon and the unincorporated town of Prospect, Oregon. It was built near Imnaha Springs by the Civilian Conservation Corps in 1939. The guard station was originally used as a barracks for Forest Service fire fighters that patrolled the surrounding forest during summer fire season. The Forest Service used the cabin to house fire crews through the 1970s. From 1970 through 1985, John (Bob) Poet and his family lived in the guard station during the summer. Poet later wrote a book about his experience at the Imnaha Guard Station. During the late 1980s and early 1990s, Forest Service volunteer campground hosts stayed in the cabin during the summer. In the mid-1990s, the Forest Service began renting the cabin to recreational visitors.

The Imnaha Guard Station has been used every summer since it was built, a relatively rare distinction for a Forest Service guard station. Because of its rustic architecture and the cabin's unique historic value as an early Forest Service guard station, it was listed on the National Register of Historic Places in 1991.

== Structure ==
The Imnaha Guard Station is located in a remote area of the Butte Falls Ranger District on the western slope of the Cascade Mountains, at about 3,800 feet (1,200 m) elevation. It is a rustic cabin surrounded by old-growth forest of mainly Douglas-fir, white fir, and incense cedar along with some ponderosa pine, sugar pine, and western white pine. The forest around the guard station is relatively undisturbed. As a result, most of the mature trees in the area are three to four feet in diameter.

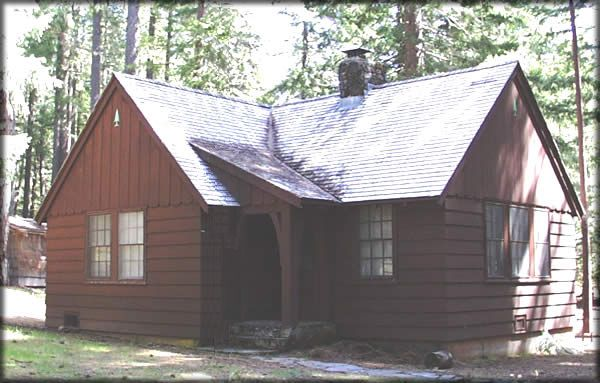
Front entrance to Imnaha Guard Station cabin

The cabin has a wood-frame structure and a concrete foundation. The exterior is covered with weatherboard and shingles. It is stained dark brown so it blends into the surrounding forest landscape.

Compared to other Forest Service guard stations the Imnaha cabin is extremely well equipped. The cabin has three rooms plus an indoor bathroom. There is a pine-paneled living room with a large lava-rock fireplace. The living room is furnished with a hide-a-bed couch, a reclining chair, and a coffee table. The Forest Service provides firewood which is stored in the guard station's garage to keep it dry. The kitchen has a stove, refrigerator, and lighted work area plus a table and chairs. Potable water for drinking and cooking is available from the kitchen tap. The bedroom has a built-in closet, a full-size bed, and two small dressers. The bathroom has hot water, a flush toilet, and a shower. All the cabin's appliances and utilities run on propane.

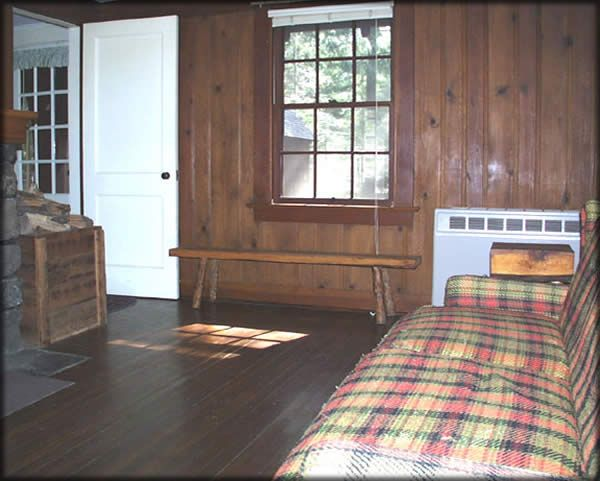
*Cabin living room

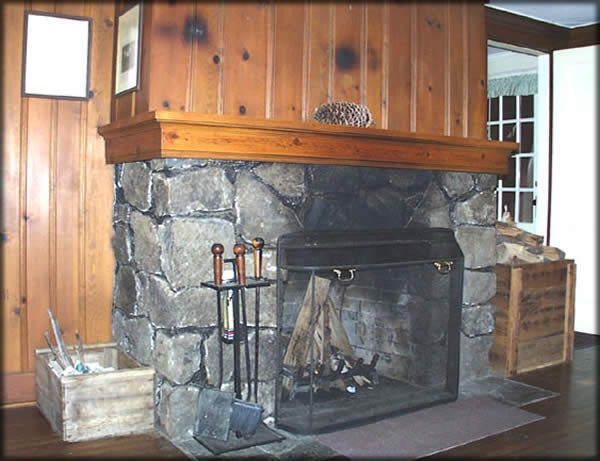
*Lava-rock fireplace

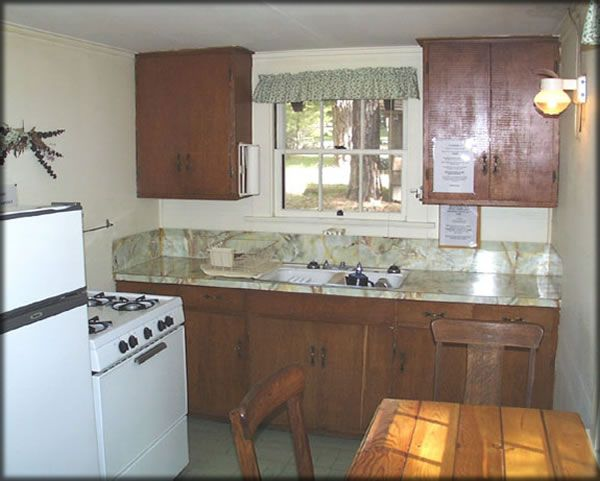
*Kitchen work area

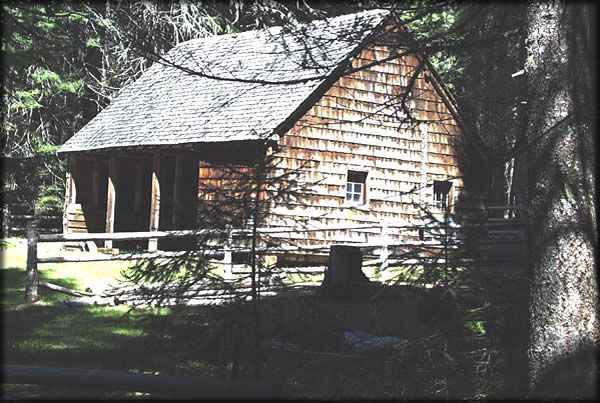
*Guard station garage

The yard around the guard station is fenced. A picnic table in the backyard allows visitor to dine outside under the trees. No tents are permitted inside the fenced area. However, visitors that need to accommodate more than six people can set up camping tents in the adjacent Imnaha Campground. There is a garage, a barn, and a horse corral on the guard station grounds. The garage is used to store wood for cabin guests. The barn and corral are still used by the Forest Service and are off-limits to the public.

== Recreation ==
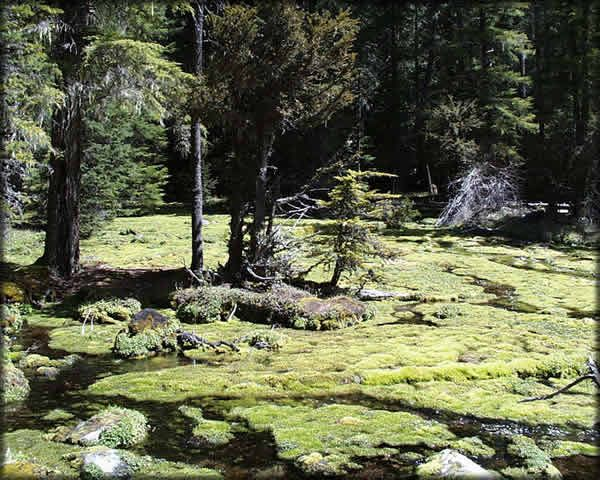
Imnaha Springs near the guard station cabin

Imnaha Springs is a fifteen-minute hike from the cabin's front door. The spring covers a relatively wide area, forming numerous rivulets that flow along a scenic path through yellow monkeyflower and moss before joining together to create Imnaha Creek.

Another attraction just a short walk from the cabin is "The Big Tree," a particularly large Douglas-fir. The Big Tree is located a few hundred feet down a trail from Imnaha Campground. The tree is at least 300 years old, and its wet, lush environment has encouraged growth. While many trees in the area are over four feet in diameter, The Big Tree is a neighborhood giant.

Birdwatchers will find varied thrushes and hermit thrushes in the dense timber around the guard station. Nuthatches, chickadees, and Steller's jays are common. There are also pileated woodpeckers in the surrounding forest, but they can be hard to spot.

In the summer, visitor can hike near-by trails. The Sky Lakes Wilderness trail system is particularly popular. The Sky Lake trail network includes a 35-mile (56 km) section of the Pacific Crest Trail that follows the crest of the Cascade Mountains. There are several trailheads leading into the Sky Lakes Wilderness within a few miles from the Imnaha Guard Station.

== Access ==
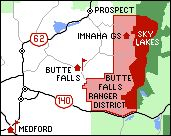
Site of Imnaha Guard Station

The Imnaha Guard Station is available for public reservations from mid-May to mid-October at a rate of $40 per night. The rental fee is used to preserve and maintain the guard station. The maximum capacity of the cabin is six people; however, the recommended occupancy is four. Guest must reserve the cabin for at least one night. The maximum stay is seven consecutive nights. Visitors must bring their own sleeping bags or bedding, cooking utensils, dishes, garbage bags, toiletries, towels, and first aid kit.

Imnaha Guard Station is located 23 miles (37 km) north of Butte Falls and 14 miles (23 km) south of the unincorporated town of Prospect, just off Forest Service Road 37 (also known as the Parker Meadows Road). Turn off the road at the Imnaha Campground entrance. The Imnaha Guard Station cabin is located at the far end of the campground. In the winter, the road to the guard station is closed to vehicles traffic due to the area's heavy snowfall. Additional information on travel routes and seasonal road condition is available during normal business hours from the Butte Falls Ranger Station office in Butte Falls or the Rogue River-Siskiyou National Forest headquarters in Medford, Oregon.
