= Medford Hotel =

Building in Medford, Oregon, U.S.

- U.S. National Register of Historic Places
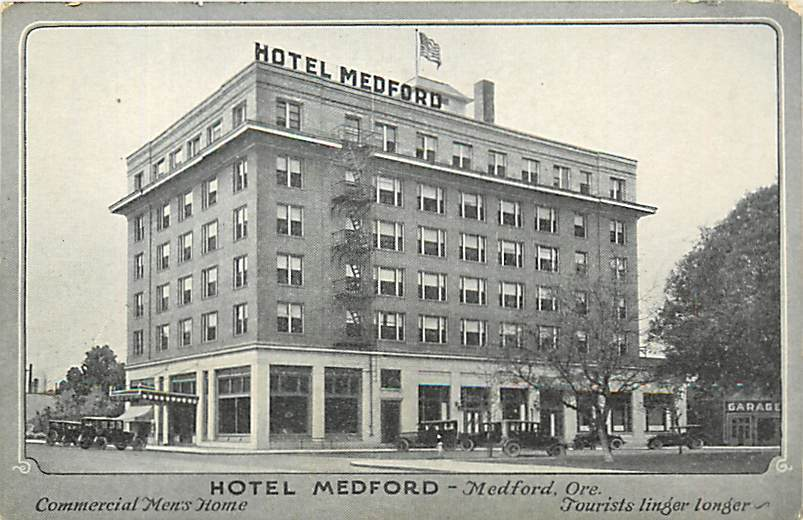

- Location within Oregon Location within the United States
- Location: 406 W. Main St. Medford, Oregon
- Coordinates: 42.3243°N 122.8772°W
- Area: less than one acre
- Built: 1910
- Architect: Frank C. Clark, Frank Forster
- Architectural style: Chicago, The Commercial Style
- NRHP reference No.: 85001180
- Added to NRHP: December 5, 1988

The Medford Hotel was a historic building in Medford, Oregon, United States. The hotel was listed on the National Register of Historic Places in 1988 but was severely damaged by a fire in the same year during a renovation. The building has since been remodeled and serves as an apartment complex.

== See also ==
- National Register of Historic Places listings in Jackson County, Oregon
