= Camp White Station Hospital Administration Building =

- U.S. National Register of Historic Places
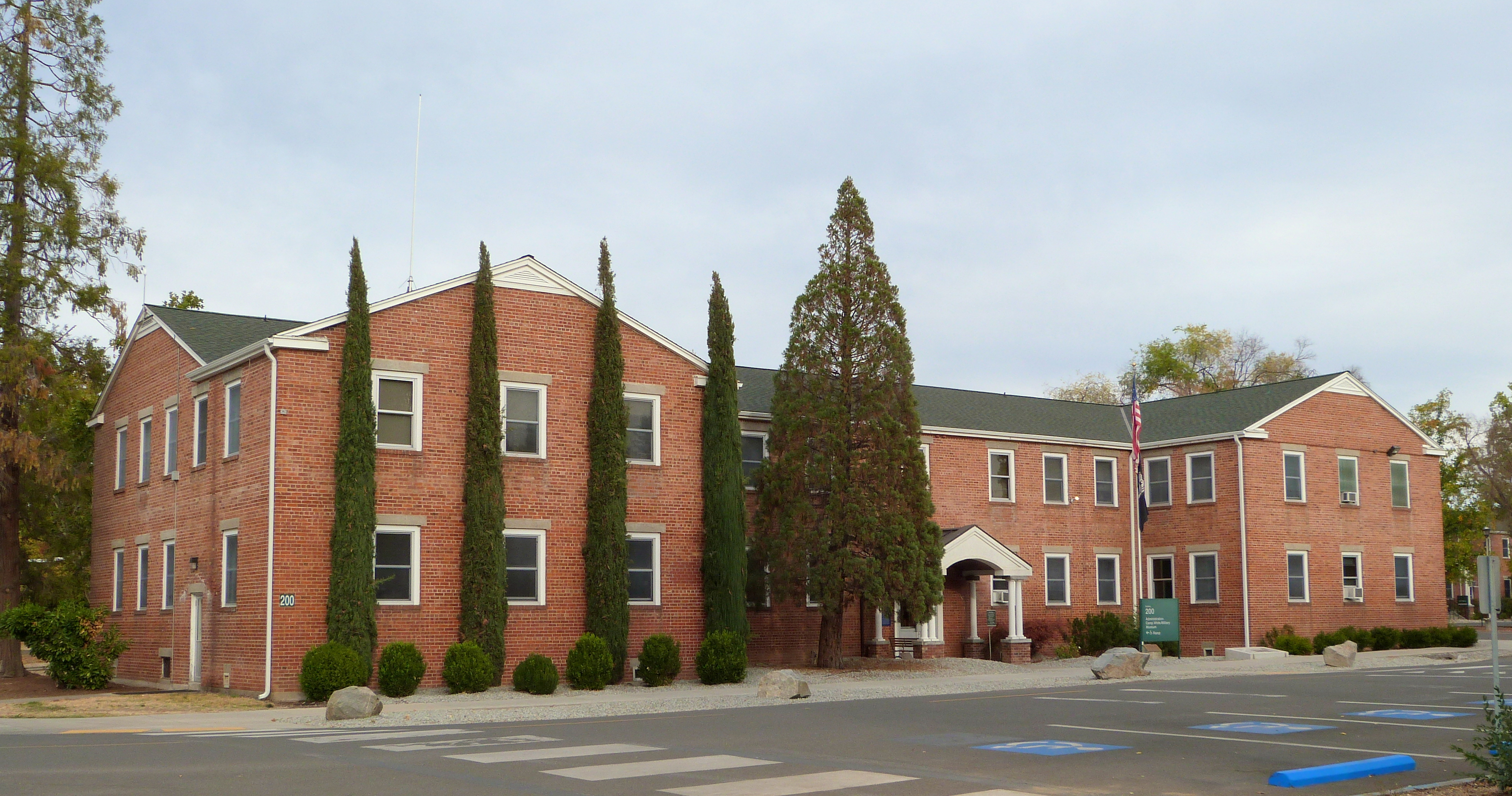

- Location within Oregon Location within the United States
- Location: 8495 Crater Lake Highway, White City, Oregon
- Coordinates: 42°26′27″N 122°50′25″W
- Area: less than one acre
- Built: 1942
- Architect: Myron Hunt
- NRHP reference No.: 16000881
- Added to NRHP: December 20, 2016

The Camp White Station Hospital Administration Building is a historic government building in White City, Oregon. It is also known as Building 200 of the Southern Oregon - White City VA Rehabilitation Center & Clinics, located at 8495 Crater Lake Highway. It is a two-story brick building with modest Colonial Revival features, built in 1942 as part of the Camp White training base. Its original purpose was to house the administration of the base's hospital, and it has continued to house medical administrative facilities for the United States Department of Veterans Affairs in the years following World War II. It is the best-preserved of the base's hospital buildings, and was listed on the National Register of Historic Places in 2016.

== See also ==
- National Register of Historic Places listings in Jackson County, Oregon
