= Willow Prairie Cabin =

- U.S. National Register of Historic Places
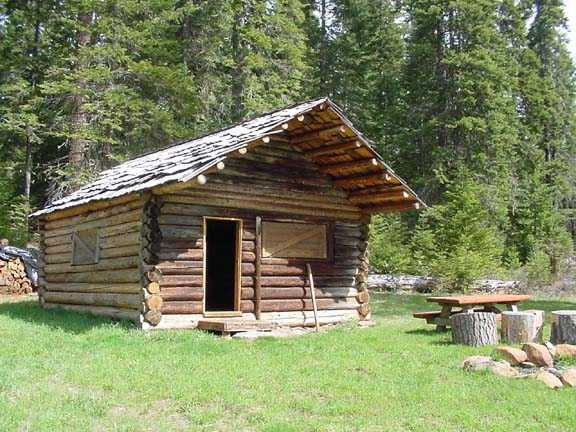
- Location: Rogue River-Siskiyou National Forest
- Nearest city: Butte Falls, Oregon
- Coordinates: 42.40655°N 122.39250°W
- Built: 1924
- Architectural style: Rustic forest cabin
- NRHP reference No.: 00000469
- Added to NRHP: 2000

The Willow Prairie Cabin is a rustic one-room cabin located in the Rogue River-Siskiyou National Forest in western Oregon, United States. It was built by a road construction crew in 1924. When the road was finished the United States Forest Service began using it to house fire crews assigned to patrol the surrounding National Forest. The Forest Service now rents the cabin to recreational visitors. The Willow Prairie Cabin is listed on the National Register of Historic Places.

== History ==
The Willow Prairie Cabin was built in 1924 by a Forest Service road crew that was constructing a highway from Butte Falls to Fish Lake. Because the forest roads were not well developed, it was impractical for workers to make a daily round-trip from Butte Falls to the remote Willow Prairie construction site. To facilitate work at the sites, the road crew used the Willow Prairie Cabin as their base-camp from 1924 until the highway was finished in 1926.

When the road was completed, the Forest Service began using the cabin as a barracks to house fire crews assigned to patrol the Willow Prairie area. In the 1950s, the Forest Service built the Willow Prairie Campground adjacent to the cabin. In the early 1990s, the Forest Service built 19 miles of interconnecting horse trails in the Willow Prairie area. In 1991, the Willow Prairie Campground was converted into a horse camp and the cabin was opened to the public as a rental unit.

The simple log structure is an excellent example of an early Forest Service wilderness crew cabin. Because of the cabin's rustic architecture and its unique historic value as an early Forest Service guard station, the Willow Prairie Cabin was listed on the National Register of Historic Places in 2000.

== Structure ==
The Willow Prairie Cabin is located in a remote area of the Butte Falls Ranger District in the Rogue River-Siskiyou National Forest. It sits on the western slope of the Cascade Mountains, at about 4,300 feet (1,300 m) elevation. The cabin is surrounded by a mature conifer forest just southwest of Mount McLoughlin. It is adjacent to Willow Prairie meadow, a large high country wetland with several beaver ponds.

The Willow Prairie Cabin is a one-room log structure with a wooden shake roof. There are two shutter-style windows without glass. Heat is provided by a wood-burning stove. The cabin's rustic furnishings include a table and chairs along with two simple sleeping cots. The cabin has built-in counter-space for preparing meals and places to hang lanterns. However, visitors must bring their own lanterns or lights as well as a portable camp stove, cookware, utensils, and bedding. The Willow Prairie Cabin has a maximum capacity is four people, and is available to rent throughout the year. The $15 per night rental fee is used to preserve and maintain the cabin.

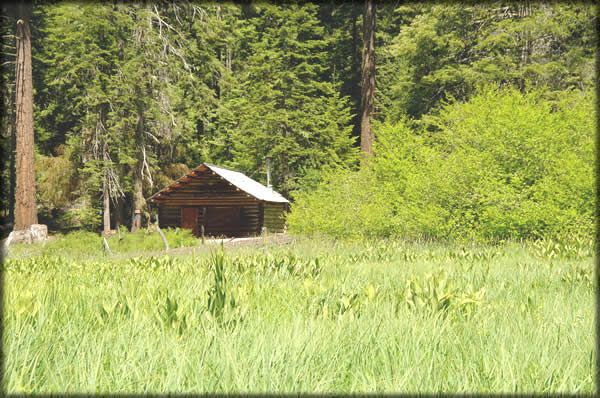
*Willow Prairie meadow

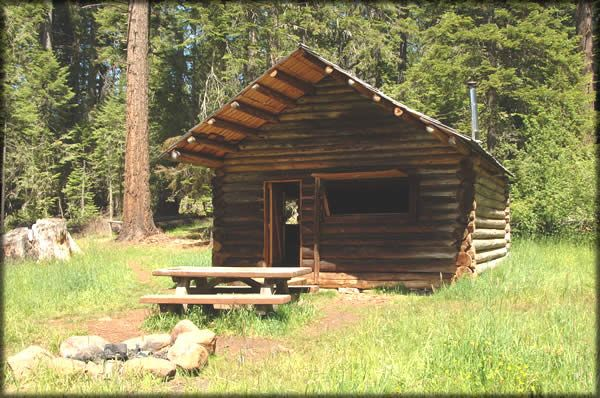
*Cabin picnic area

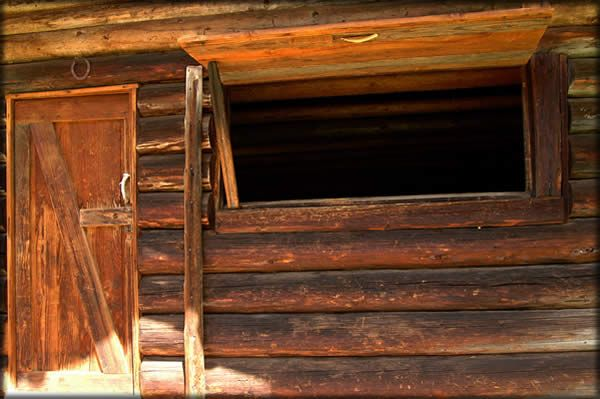
*Shutter-style window

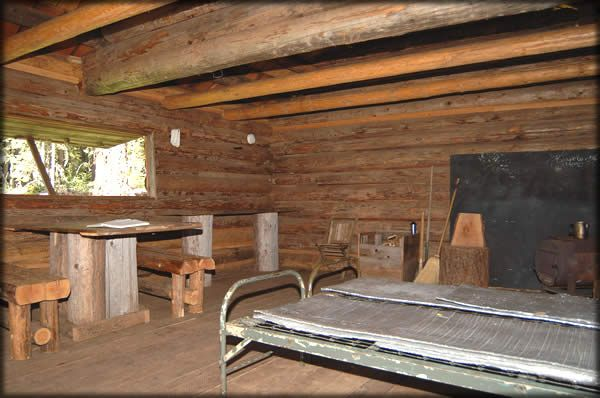
*Rustic cabin interior

There is a picnic table and a rock fire-ring outside the cabin. Firewood is usually available at the site; however, visitors are encouraged to bring firewood or an alternate heating source just in case the wood bin is empty. A vault-toilet is located near the cabin. During the summer, potable water is available from a hand pump approximately 400 feet from the cabin.

== Recreation ==
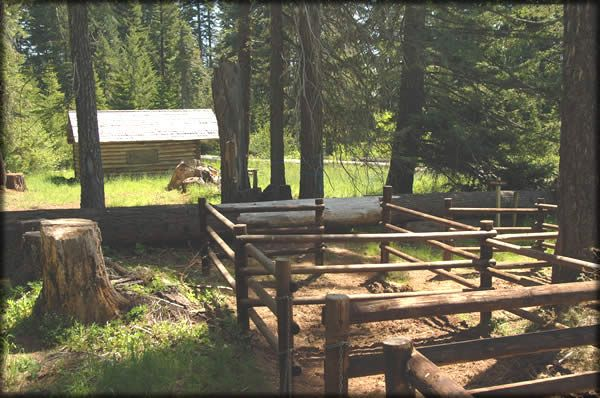
Horse camp corrals with cabin in the background

There are over nineteen miles of horse trails in the forest surrounding Willow Prairie Cabin. As a result, horseback riding is the reason many visitors come to Willow Prairie. The cabin is adjacent to the Willow Prairie campground and horse camp. The campground has ten campsites each with a picnic table and fire pit along with four 12-foot by 12-foot corrals. The campground has two vault toilets. There is also potable water from a hand-pumped well plus two troughs for watering horses. To protect the Willow Prairie meadow, riders are required to stay on marked trails, and horses must be kept in a corral when not being ridden. The Forest Service provides a trailer for manure, which must be cleared from camp corrals before departure.

In addition to horseback riding, visitor can enjoy camping or hunting in season. Bird watching is also a popular summer pastime. Among the bird common to Willow Prairie meadow and the surrounding forest are sandhill cranes, great blue herons, Canada geese, red-tailed hawks, and a wide variety of ducks. Deer and elk are also common near the meadow. During the winter, the area offers the opportunity for cross-country skiing, snowshoeing, and snowmobiling.

== Access ==
Willow Prairie Cabin is located 17 miles (27 km) southeast of Butte Falls, Oregon and 40 miles (64 km) east of Medford, Oregon. It is accessible via County Road 821 (the Butte Falls-Fish Lake Highway) to Forest Service Road 3738 and Forest Road 3735.
