= Mountain View Cemetery (Ashland, Oregon) =

Historic cemetery in Jackson County, Oregon, US

- U.S. National Register of Historic Places
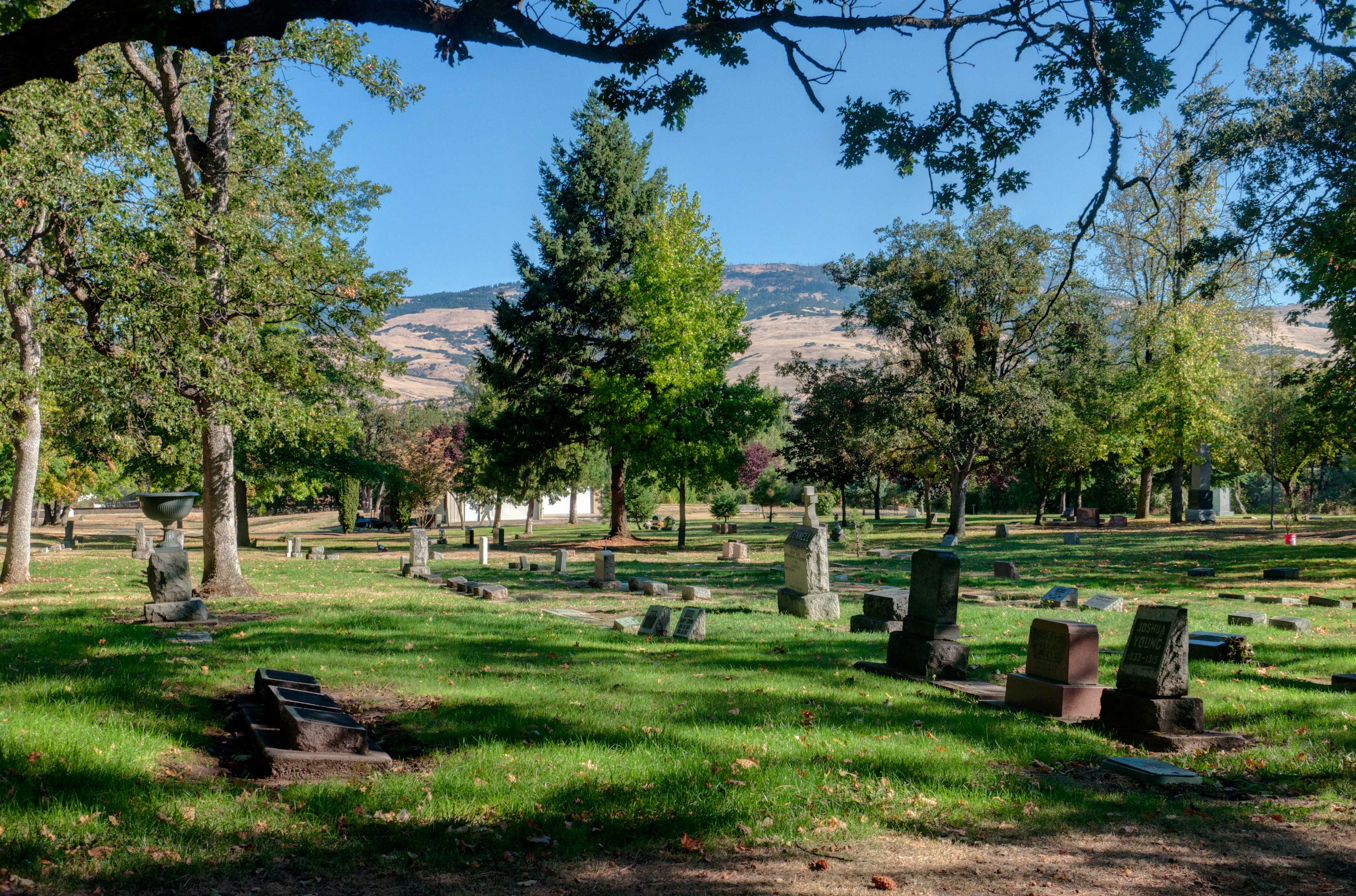

- Location within Oregon Location within the United States
- Location: Junction of Normal Avenue and OR 66, Ashland, Oregon
- Coordinates: 42°11′8″N 122°40′53″W
- Area: 9 acres (3.6 ha)
- Built: 1904
- Architectural style: Late 19th and 20th Century Revivals, Egyptian Revival
- MPS: Historic Cemeteries of Ashland MPS
- NRHP reference No.: 95000688
- Added to NRHP: June 8, 1995

Mountain View Cemetery (also known as Resthaven Crypts and Niches) is a cemetery in Ashland, Oregon, in the United States. It was listed on the National Register of Historic Places in 1994 "in recognition of its historic significance and fine array of mortuary art and craftsmanship". In 2013, the cemetery was listed with the Oregon Commission on Historical Cemeteries.

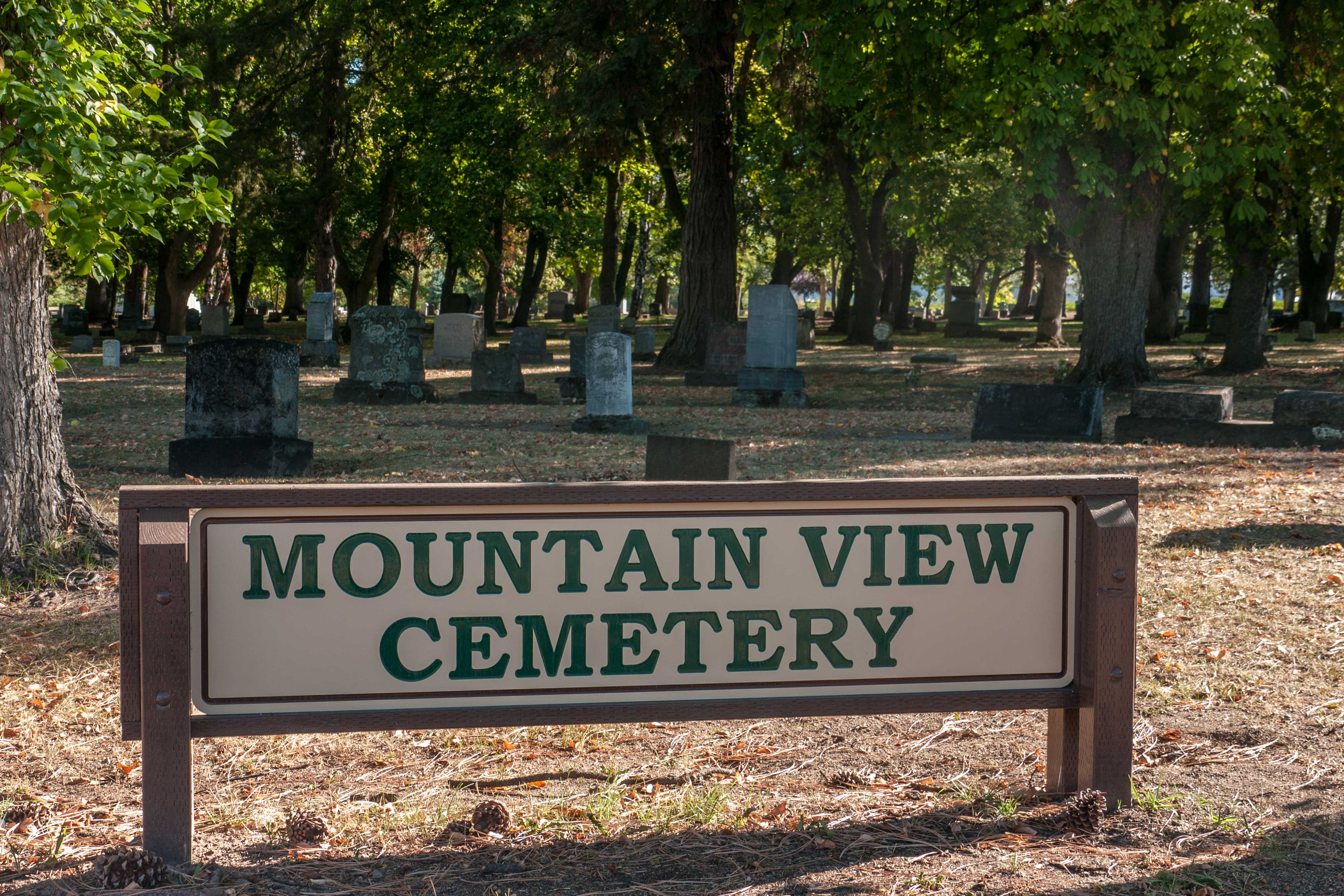
Signage

== See also ==
- National Register of Historic Places listings in Jackson County, Oregon
