= Kathryn Lee =

American newspaper publisher

Kathryn C. Lee (1935–2013) was an American newspaper publisher who helped found the first African American newspaper, The Sacramento Observer, in Sacramento, California in 1962.

== Early life and education ==
Kathryn Lee was born on November 19, 1935 in New Orleans, Louisiana. She attended San Francisco State University. In 1962, she married William H. Lee and they purchased the newspaper, which was then called The Sacramento Outlook.

== Career ==
Lee was the first African American to work at the Sacramento County Sheriff in 1956 and the first African American to serve on the Sacramento Grand Jury in 1973. She later worked full time as assistant publisher at The Sacramento Observer and ultimately ran the newspaper's finances. When one of the paper's co-founders died and a business partner left in 1965, the couple ran the paper themselves and kept it from folding.

Since it started as a four-page newspaper, it has grown into a leading Black newspaper in the country, honored by the National Newspaper Publishers Association and called the "main source of news for Sacramento's Black communities."

== Awards and honors ==
Lee won many honors including:

- 1970 Woman of the Year by the Women's Civic Improvement Club of Sacramento
- 1991 Greyhound Corporation’s Woman of the Year
- 1993 National Council of Negro of Women, Sacramento Valley Section’s “Most Outstanding Women” award
- 1999 recipient of the Second Annual Madame CJ Walker Entrepreneurial Award
- 2002 Pioneer Award National Coalition of 100 Black Women, Sacramento Chapter
- 2002 Partnership Service Award from Links, Inc.

== Death and legacy ==
Lee died on March 25, 2013, at her home in Oak Park, California. One of her children, Larry Lee, is now publisher of The Sacramento Observer.
