= Jacksonville-to-Fort Klamath Military Wagon Road =

- U.S. National Register of Historic Places
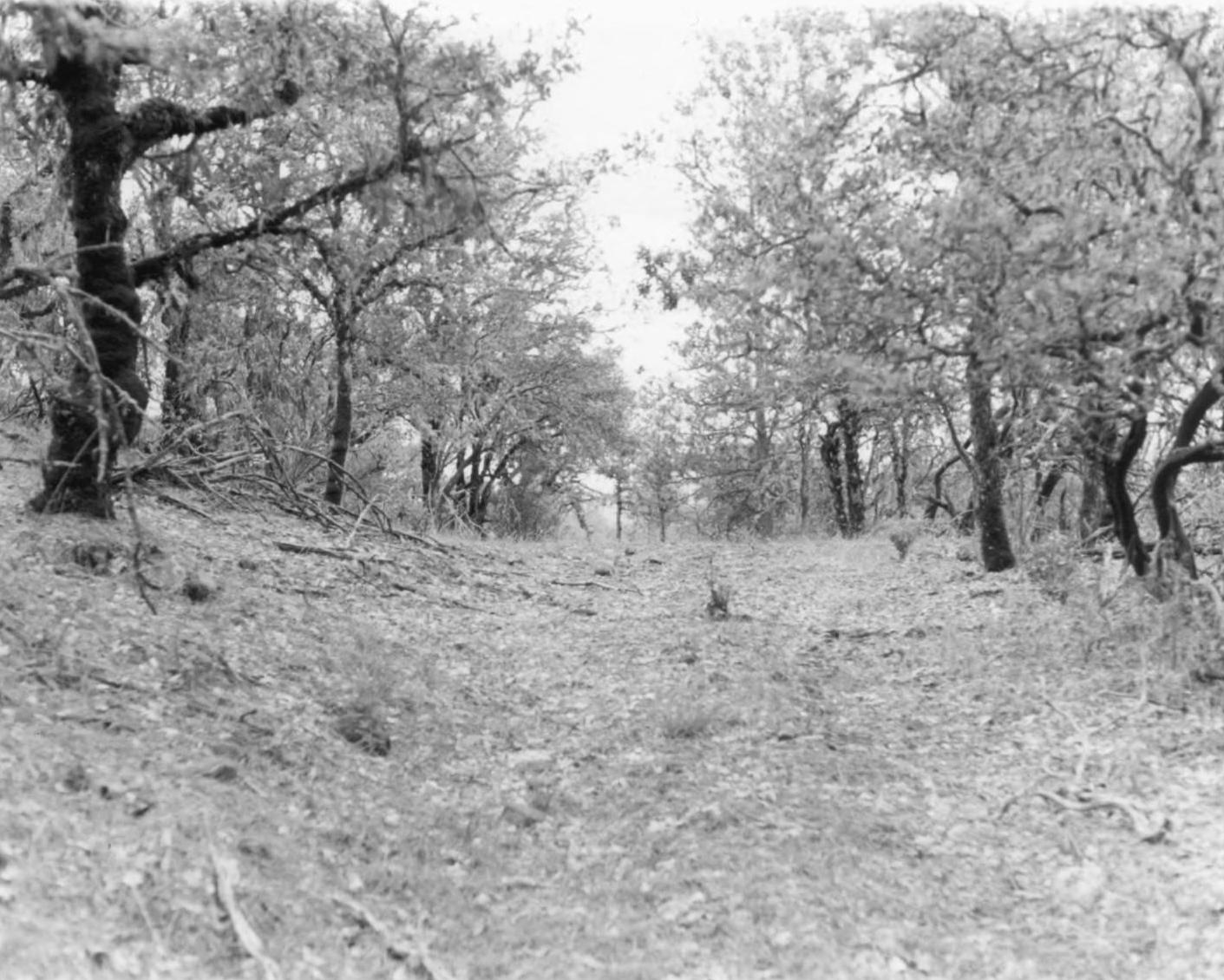

- Location within Oregon
- Location: South of Butte Falls, Oregon
- Coordinates: 42°28′46″N 122°26′57″W
- Area: 154 acres (62 ha)
- Built: 1863
- Built by: Dept. of the Army
- NRHP reference No.: 79002068
- Added to NRHP: May 16, 1979

The Jacksonville-to-Fort Klamath Military Wagon Road, from Jacksonville, Oregon, to Fort Klamath in Fort Klamath, Oregon, was built in 1863 by the United States Department of the Army. Segments of the road were listed on the National Register of Historic Places in 1979. The listing included four contributing structures.

It incorporates part or all of Rancheria Road (also known as Rancheria Trail), Fourmile Lake Rd., Butte Falls-to-Pelican Bay Road, Mt. Pitt Road, and Col. Drew's Road. It crossed Fourbit Ford on Fourbit Creek.

It was the first "trans-Cascadian" wagon road, and connected the Rogue River Valley and the upper Klamath Basin.

Among other effects, the road brought the first sawmill to the Klamath Basin.

It is believed that 1909 is the date of the last wagon traversal of the entire road, and that the 1910 Cat Hill Fire contributed to its effective closure.
