= Rogue Elk Hotel =

- U.S. National Register of Historic Places
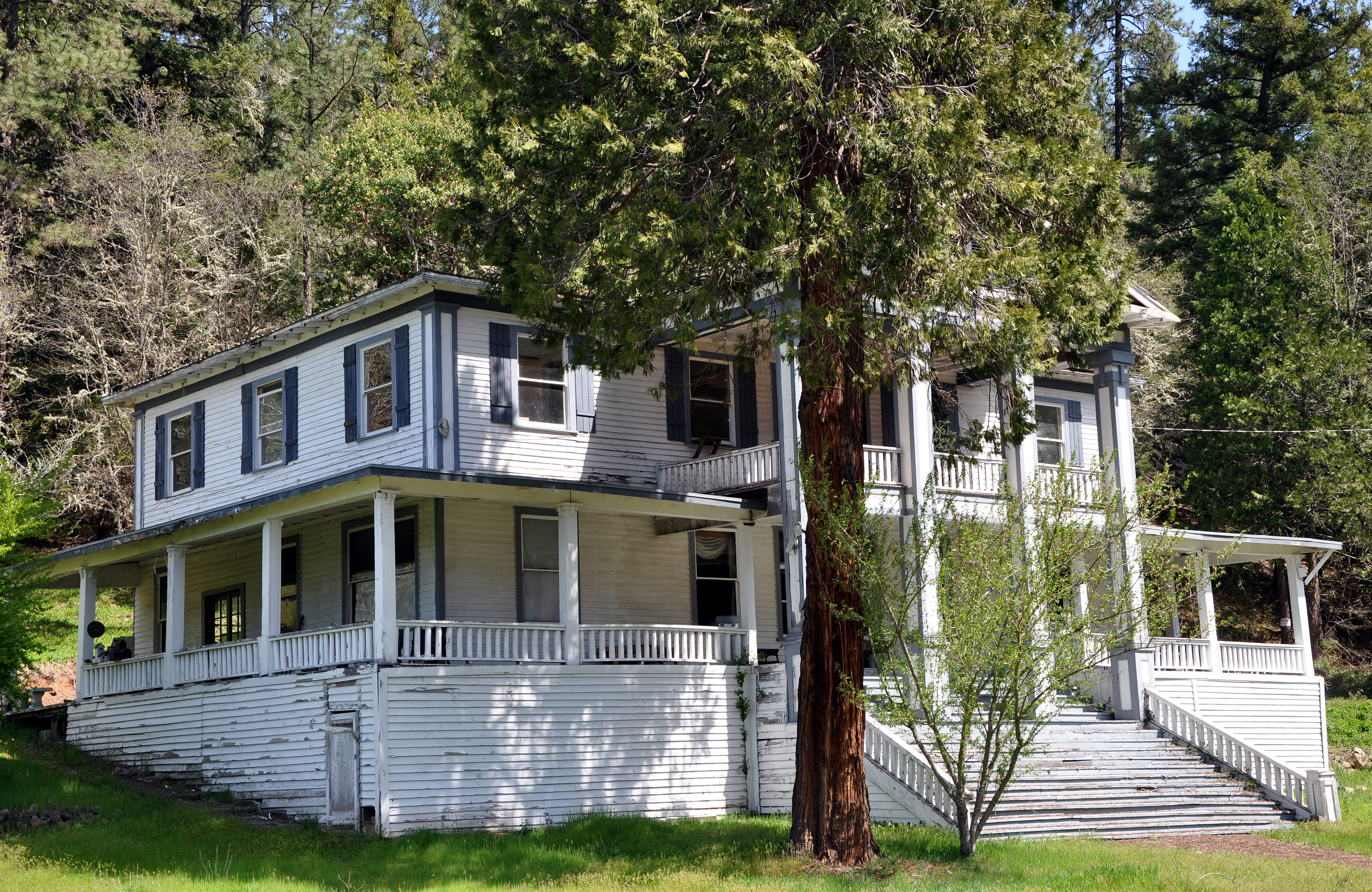
- The building in 2010

- Location within Oregon Location within the United States
- Location: 27390 OR 62, Trail, Oregon
- Coordinates: 42°39′44″N 122°45′25″W
- Area: 2.3 acres (0.93 ha)
- Built: 1915
- Built by: W.G. McDonald
- Architect: Charles Power
- Architectural style: Colonial Revival, Stick
- NRHP reference No.: 80003329
- Added to NRHP: 22 February 1980

The Rogue Elk Hotel is a historic building in Trail, Oregon.

== Description and history ==
The hotel was constructed in 1915 by W.G. McDonald, a Canadian artist and his brothers. Designed by Charles Power it reflects Colonial Revival and Stick architectural styles. The Rogue Elk Inn held its grand opening on July 22, 1916, with an event attended by 200 Rogue River Valley residents. Notable guests have included Herbert Hoover, Zane Grey and Clark Gable. In the 1950s McDonald died, his widow sold the building a period of decline began. It was listed on the National Register of Historic Places in 1980.

== See also ==
- Historic preservation
- Oregon Trail
