= Medford station (Oregon) =

Medford
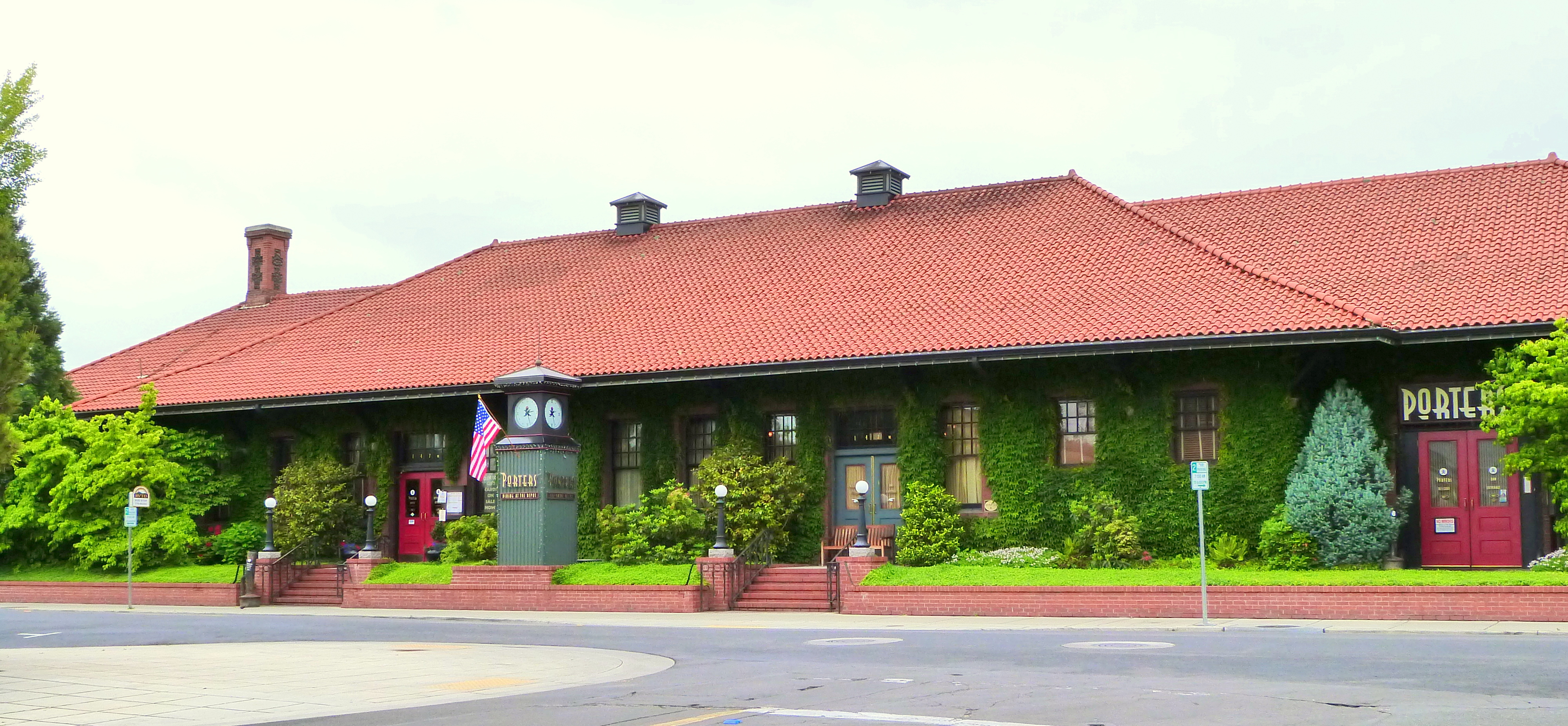
- The station's exterior in 2013

General information
- Location: 147 N. Front Street; Medford, Oregon
- Coordinates: 42°19′39″N 122°52′29″W

History
- Opened: 1883
- Closed: 1955
- Rebuilt: 1900, 1910
- Original company: Oregon and California Railroad

Former services
| Preceding station | Southern Pacific Railroad | Following station |
|---|---|---|
| Talent toward Oakland Pier | Shasta Route | Central Point toward Portland |
- Medford Southern Pacific Railroad Passenger Depot
- U.S. National Register of Historic Places
- U.S. Historic district – Contributing property
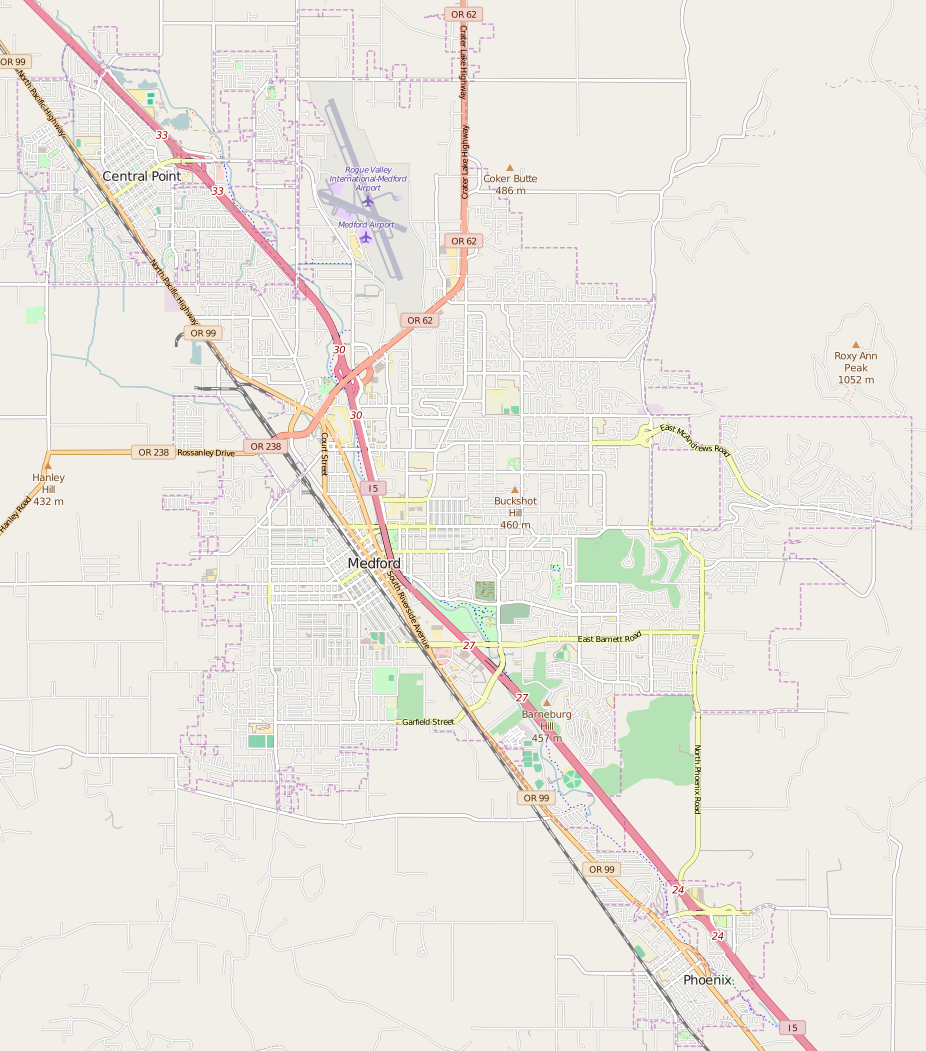
- Location within Medford OR Location within Oregon
- Area: .54 acres (0.22 ha)
- Built: 1910
- Built by: R.W. Wakefield
- Architect: Southern Pacific Railroad
- Architectural style: Craftsman
- Part of: Medford Downtown Historic District (ID98000949)
- NRHP reference No.: 96000629
- Added to NRHP: June 3, 1996
Location

The Medford Southern Pacific Railroad Passenger Depot is a former rail station located in Medford, Oregon listed on the National Register of Historic Places.

== History ==
The first station in Medford, located between 8th and Main, was constructed by the Oregon and California Railroad in 1883 as the temporary terminal until the road could be completed over Siskiyou Pass. It was replaced by a new station slightly to the south in 1900. The original depot building was loaded onto three flatcars over two days in June and transported to Talent, where it was repurposed as that town's station.

Southern Pacific selected the location for a new station for Medford in January 1910; it would be located two blocks north of the city's former depot. The modern station opened to the public on October 28. The 1900-built station was moved further south and repurposed as a freight depot. Passenger service ended in 1955.

The 1910-built station building was added to the National Register of Historic Places on June 3, 1996.

== See also ==
- National Register of Historic Places listings in Jackson County, Oregon
