= Chavner Family House =

Historic house in Oregon, United States

- U.S. National Register of Historic Places
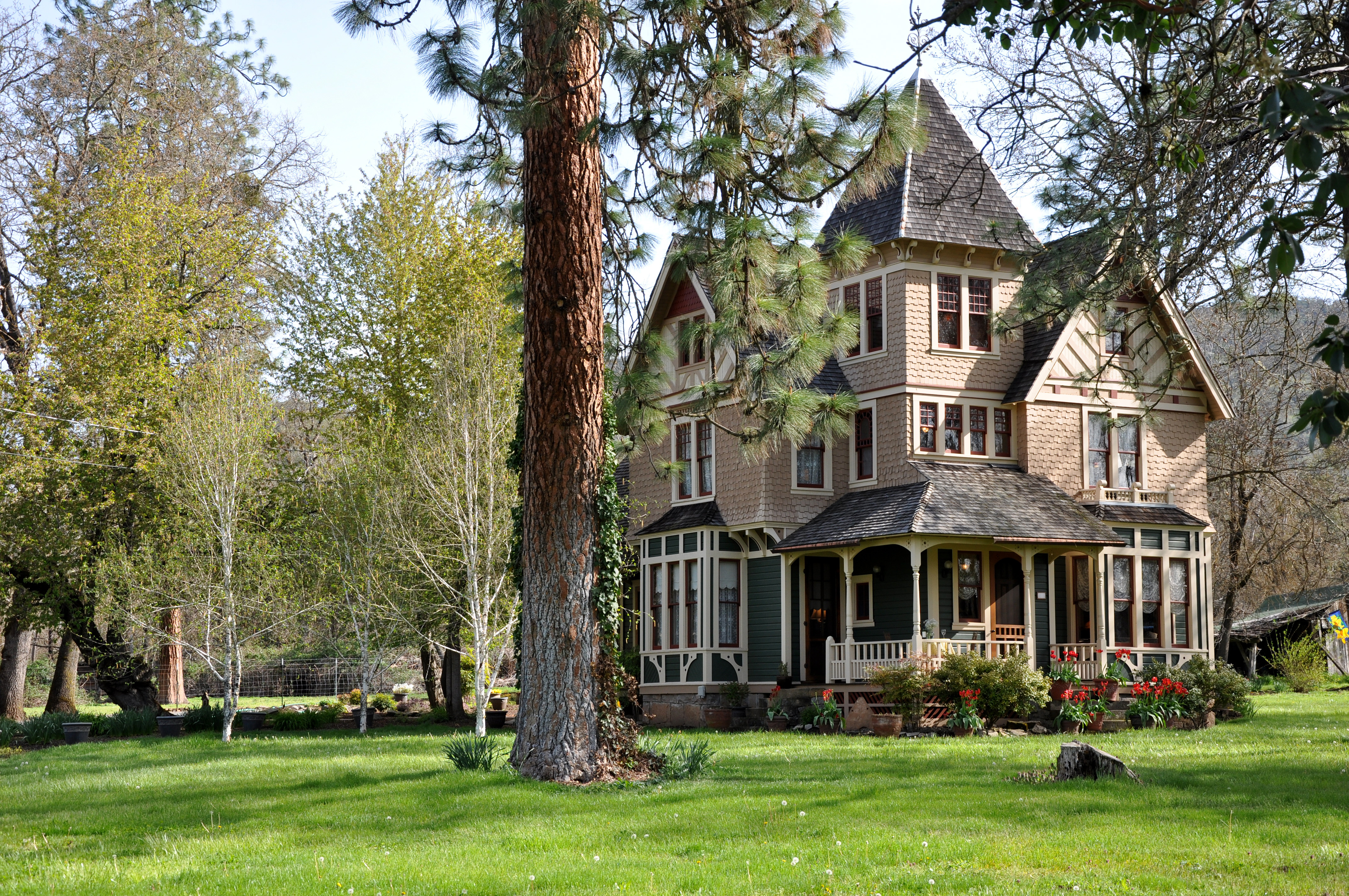
- The house in 2010

- Location within Oregon Location within the United States
- Nearest city: Gold Hill, Oregon
- Coordinates: 42°25′50″N 123°2′3″W
- Area: 1.6 acres (0.65 ha)
- Built: 1892
- Architect: William Stuart
- Architectural style: Queen Anne
- NRHP reference No.: 96000628
- Added to NRHP: 31 May 1996

The Chavner Family House is a historic house in Gold Hill, Oregon.

== Description and history ==
The house was designed by William Stuart and built in 1892. It was listed on the National Register of Historic Places on May 31, 1996.

== See also ==
- Historic preservation
- Oregon Country
