= Butte Falls (Jackson County, Oregon) =

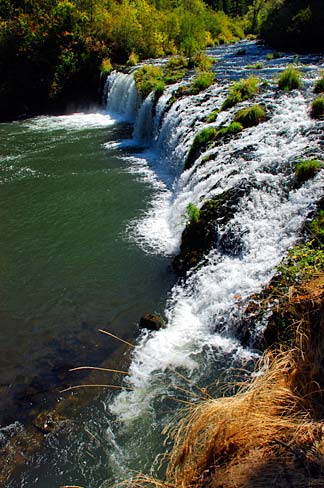
- Interactive map of Butte Falls
- Location: Big Butte Creek
- Coordinates: 42°32′45″N 122°33′43″W
- Type: Curtain
- Elevation: 2,358 ft (719 m)
- Total height: 15 ft (4.6 m)
- Average flow rate: 500–800 cu ft/s (14–23 m^{3}/s)

Butte Falls is a waterfall located near the town of Butte Falls in Jackson County, in the U.S. state of Oregon. It totals 15 feet (4.6 m) tall in one wide cascade and is runnable by whitewater kayak on the right side shooting into a large bowl. In the past, the waterfall was the site of a water-driven sawmill that led to the town of Butte Falls.

== See also ==
- Other waterfalls in Oregon with similar names:
  - Butte Creek and its Butte Creek Falls
  - Upper Butte Creek Falls
