= The Sacramento Observer =

Newspaper in Sacramento, California

- Type: African-American newspaper
- Owner: Lee Publishing Company
- Founder(s): William H. Lee; Gino Gladden; John W. Cole
- Publisher: Larry Lee
- Editor-in-chief: Stephen Magagnini
- Managing editor: Angelica Obioha
- Founded: November 22, 1962
- Language: English
- Headquarters: 2890 Gateway Oaks Dr., Suite 230; Sacramento, California
- ISSN: 0036-2212
- Website: sacobserver.com

The Sacramento Observer is an African-American-owned weekly newspaper in Sacramento, California. It serves the Black community throughout the Sacramento Metropolitan Area. The newspaper was founded in 1962 at a time when African American voices were still largely absent from the mainstream media in the region. It has played a central role in Black culture in Sacramento for decades. The paper is owned by Lee family, whose business Lee Publishing Company at one point published six publications in California and Nevada. The Observer was the catalyst for organizing the local chapter of the National Urban League and has sponsored numerous community events including the Sacramento Black Expo.

== History ==
In 1942, Rev. John T. Muse founded The Sacramento Outlook, a community newspaper serving the Black community in Oak Park. Muse, a Baptist minister, published the paper for 20 years. Upon retiring, he sold it to a group of six business men including William Hanford Lee. At that time the paper was mailed weekly to 300 subscribers. The Outlook was the Capital city's first black newspaper. After the sale the paper was rebranded as The Sacramento Observer on Thanksgiving day in November 1962.

William Lee, who founded the Men's Civic League which purchased the paper, managed the Observer with two others, Eugene "Geno" Gladden and John W. Cole. The three bought the paper and expanded it into a broadsheet motivated over frustration from the lack of coverage on the local Black community from The Sacramento Bee and The Sacramento Union. Lee was 26-years-old when he became part-owner. In 1965, he assumed the newspaper's debt from his two partners and the role of publisher. The paper wasn't profitable for years and in 1968 lost $60,000. Lee sold his thriving real estate business in an attempt to salvage the paper.

William Lee was an advocate for Black journalists in Sacramento. He persuaded both The Sacramento Bee and the Stockton Record to hire their first Black reporters, both Observer alumni. In the late 1960s, the Capitol Correspondents Association refused to grant membership to journalists from the Observer because the newspaper was a weekly. The association later relented, and granted the Observer access to cover the California State Capitol in 1973. William Lee became sole-owner when one partner died and another was bought out. By the paper's 10th anniversary, the Sacramento Observer had won 50 awards and boasted a circulation of 22,500.

A decade later the Observer had 42,000 subscribers, a staff of 35 and had won the John B. Russwurm Award from National Newspaper Publishers Association. In 2001, the paper launched its website. Around that time the paper's readership was about 75-80% African-American while the paper's staff was 50-60% Black. The Observer's president and CEO Lawrence "Larry" C. Lee said the paper historically had not been treated as a legitimate member of the press and it was difficult to retain quality staff "because they're often lured away by larger publications with fewer responsibilities and bigger paychecks." William Lee ran the Observer for decades with his wife Katheryn C. Lee. By 2003, the paper had won 500 local and national awards, and the Russwurm Award, the highest honor in African American journalism, six times.

William Lee oversaw the editorial-side while his wife oversaw the finances. In 2013, Katheryn Lee died at age 77. The couple had three children together, Roddy Lee (who died in 1994), Billy Lee Jr. and Larry Lee, who in 2015 became the paper's publisher. In 2019, William Lee died. He was 83. At that time the couple's youngest son Larry Lee took over the Observer. In May 2020, the Observer was one of 10 Black-owned newspapers to join Word in Black, an initiative to post stories on a shared website aimed at a national audience. In August 2020, after five decades headquartered in Oak Park, the paper relocated to a new office space in the Old North Sacramento neighborhood.

In 2021, the paper was redesigned after its look had remained unchanged throughout its existence. In 2023, the paper won its seventh Russwurm Award. In 2025, William H. Lee was inducted into the California Newspaper Hall of Fame. In May 2026, the Observer expanded to Stockton after launching a dedicated news site for that city called Stockton Represented. In June 2026, the website of the Sacramento News and Review was donated to the Observer.
