= Women's Civic Improvement Clubhouse (Ashland, Oregon) =

- U.S. National Register of Historic Places
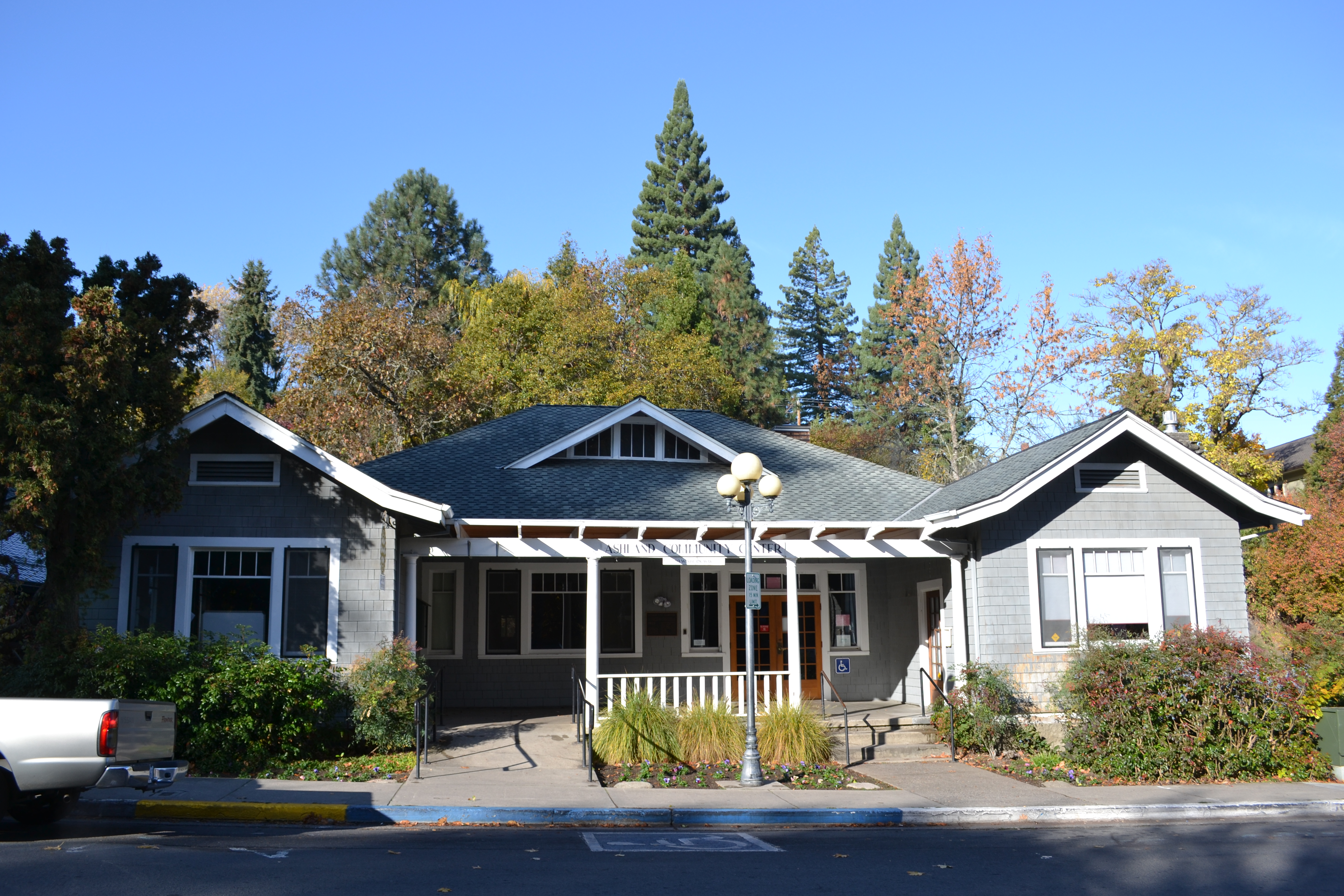

- Location within Oregon
- Location: 59 Winburn Way, Ashland, Oregon
- Coordinates: 42°11′45″N 122°43′00″W
- Area: 0.2 acres (0.081 ha)
- Built: 1921-22
- Built by: A.L. Lamb
- Architectural style: Bungalow/craftsman
- NRHP reference No.: 89000513
- Added to NRHP: June 16, 1989

The Women's Civic Improvement Clubhouse, at 59 Winburn Way in Ashland, Oregon, was built during 1921–22. Its construction was funded by the Ashland Women's Civic Improvement Club and the philanthropy of Jesse Winburn. It was listed on the National Register of Historic Places in 1989.

== Ashland Women's Civic Improvement Club ==
The Ashland Women's Civic Improvement Club was a women's club established in 1908. Involved in raising funds to improve Ashland, they were part of the City Beautiful movement. Along with other civic projects, the club helped expand Lithia Park.

== The building ==
The Women's Civic Improvement Clubhouse was designed and build by contractor A.L. Lamb. It is a one-and-a-half-story building, 74.5 by 61.5 feet (22.7 m × 18.7 m) in plan, counting its large covered porch. It is an Arts and Crafts bungalow in style.

The clubhouse served as a USO headquarters during World War II, and later as the Ashland Parks and Recreation Department building. The City of Ashland has owned the building since the 1960s. It has been known as the Winburn Community Center. In 1985 the building was restored by the city and is now named the Ashland Community Center.
