= Butte Falls, Oregon =

- City
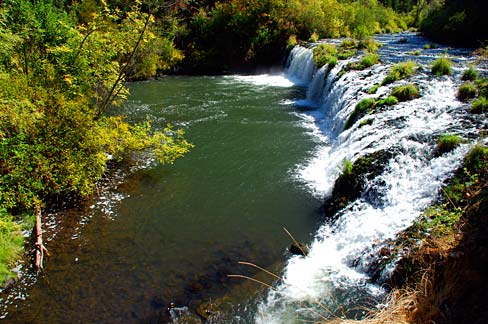
- Big Butte Creek Falls, the city's namesake, located on the South Fork of Big Butte Creek

- Location in Oregon
- Coordinates: 42°32′29″N 122°34′08″W
- Country: United States
- State: Oregon
- County: Jackson
- Incorporated: 1911

Area
  - Total: 0.43 sq mi (1.11 km^{2})
  - Land: 0.43 sq mi (1.11 km^{2})
  - Water: 0 sq mi (0.00 km^{2})
- Elevation: 2,549 ft (777 m)

Population (2020)
  - Total: 443
  - Density: 1,035.1/sq mi (399.66/km^{2})
- Time zone: UTC-8 (Pacific)
  - Summer (DST): UTC-7 (Pacific)
- ZIP code: 97522
- Area code: 541
- FIPS code: 41-10050
- GNIS feature ID: 2411750
- Website: www.townofbuttefalls.com

Butte Falls is a city in Jackson County, Oregon, United States. The population was 423 at the 2010 census. As of July 1, 2018, the city's population was estimated to be 450.

== History ==
In the early 1900's, lumberjacks from Michigan started cutting pine timber on the flats beside Big Butte Creek and a sawmill was built at the falls. The industry associated with this mill led to the founding of the town of Butte Falls. The Pacific & Eastern, Medco Logging Railroad line to Butte Falls was completed in 1911.

Butte Falls was incorporated as a city in 1911. A 1927 Sanborn Fire Insurance Map in the Library of Congress collection shows many of the earliest buildings in the Town of Butte Falls. Some are still in use today.

== Geography ==
According to the United States Census Bureau, the town has a total area of 0.41 square miles (1.06 km^{2}), all of it land.

=== Climate ===
This region experiences warm (but not hot) and dry summers, with no average monthly temperatures above 71.6 °F (22.0 °C). According to the Köppen Climate Classification system, Butte Falls has a warm-summer Mediterranean climate, abbreviated "Csb" on climate maps.

== Demographics ==
Historical population
Census	Pop.	Note	%±
1920	166		—
1930	298		79.5%
1940	339		13.8%
1950	372		9.7%
1960	384		3.2%
1970	358		−6.8%
1980	428		19.6%
1990	252		−41.1%
2000	438		73.8%
2010	423		−3.4%
2020	443		4.7%
U.S. Decennial Census

=== 2010 census ===
As of the census of 2010, there were 423 people, 166 households, and 112 families living in the town. The population density was 1,031.7 inhabitants per square mile (398.3/km^{2}). There were 188 housing units at an average density of 458.5 per square mile (177.0/km^{2}). The racial makeup of the town was 95.7% White, 0.7% Native American, 0.5% Asian, 0.2% Pacific Islander, and 2.8% from two or more races. Hispanic or Latino of any race were 2.4% of the population.

There were 166 households, of which 32.5% had children under the age of 18 living with them, 45.8% were married couples living together, 9.6% had a female householder with no husband present, 12.0% had a male householder with no wife present, and 32.5% were non-families. 25.9% of all households were made up of individuals, and 7.8% had someone living alone who was 65 years of age or older. The average household size was 2.55 and the average family size was 2.92.

The median age in the town was 43.1 years. 22.7% of residents were under the age of 18; 11.1% were between the ages of 18 and 24; 19.1% were from 25 to 44; 33.6% were from 45 to 64; and 13.5% were 65 years of age or older. The gender makeup of the town was 52.5% male and 47.5% female.

=== 2000 census ===
As of the US Federal census of 2000, there were 439 people, 160 households, and 112 families living in the city. The population density was 1,100.2 inhabitants per square mile (424.8/km^{2}). There were 170 housing units at an average density of 426.0 per square mile (164.5/km^{2}). The racial makeup of the city was 93.85% White, 2.73% Native American, 0.23% Asian, 0.91% from other races, and 2.28% from two or more races. Hispanic or Latino of any race were 2.51% of the population. There were 160 households, out of which 41.3% had children under the age of 18 living with them, 50.6% were married couples living together, 11.3% had a female householder with no husband present, and 29.4% were non-families. 23.1% of all households were made up of individuals, and 10.0% had someone living alone who was 65 years of age or older. The average household size was 2.74 and the average family size was 3.20.

In the city, the population was 31.9% under the age of 18, 6.8% from 18 to 24, 28.5% from 25 to 44, 21.0% from 45 to 64, and 11.8% who were 65 years of age or older. The median age was 33 years. For every 100 females, there were 104.2 males. For every 100 females age 18 and over, there were 99.3 males. The median income for a household in the city was $23,750, and the median income for a family was $30,132. Males had a median income of $27,188 versus $14,875 for females. The per capita income for the city was $11,511. About 15.1% of families and 22.1% of the population were below the poverty line, including 25.2% of those under age 18 and 28.6% of those age 65 or over.

== See also ==
- Big Butte Creek Falls
