= Lene Marlin discography =

- Studio albums: 4
- Compilation albums: 1
- Singles: 16
- Video albums: 1

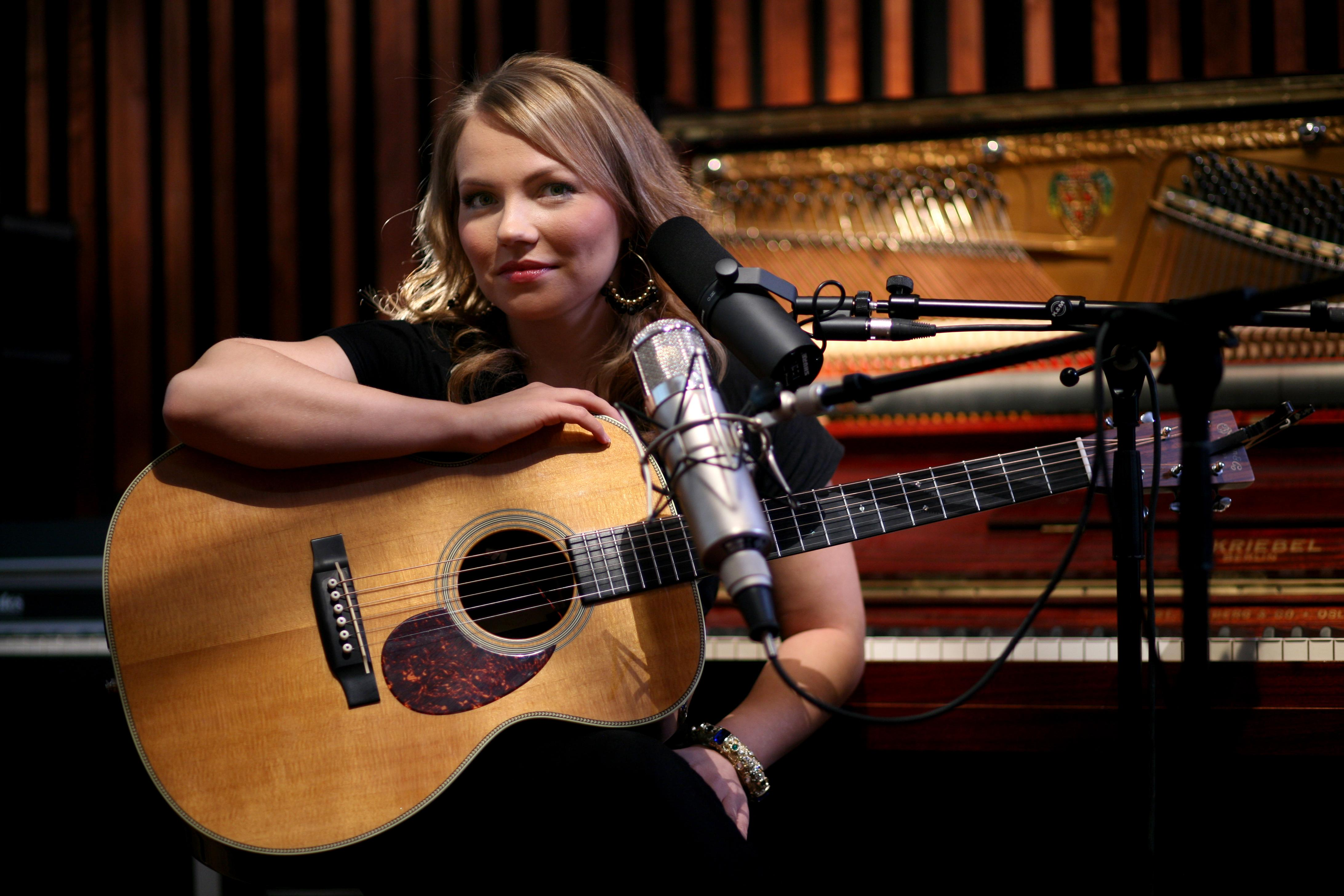
Lene Marlin

Norwegian singer Lene Marlin has released four studio albums, one compilation album, 16 singles (including two as a featured artist) and one video album.

== Albums ==
=== Studio albums ===
List of studio albums, with selected chart positions and certifications
Title	Details	Peak chart positions										Certifications
Title	Details	NOR	BEL (WA)	FRA	GER	ITA	JPN	NZ	SWE	SWI	UK	Certifications
Playing My Game	Released: 27 April 1999; Label: Virgin; Formats: CD, HDCD, MD, LP, cassette, digital download	1	49	10	76	9	28	8	8	45	18	IFPI NOR: 3× Platinum; BPI: Platinum; IFPI SWE: Gold; IFPI SWI: Gold; SNEP: Platinum
Another Day	Released: 24 September 2003; Label: Virgin; Formats: CD, HDCD, cassette, digital download	1	—	38	59	3	99	—	26	32	93	
Lost in a Moment	Released: 13 June 2005; Label: Virgin; Formats: CD, cassette, digital download	4	—	—	94	15	261	—	—	33	—	
Twist the Truth	Released: 30 March 2009; Label: Virgin; Formats: CD, digital download	3	—	—	—	44	—	—	57	67	—	
"—" denotes a recording that did not chart or was not released in that territory.

=== Compilation albums ===
List of compilation albums, with selected chart positions
Title	Details	Peak chart positions
Title	Details	NOR
Here We Are: Historier så langt	Released: 4 January 2013; Label: Parlophone; Format: Digital download	15

== Singles ==
=== As lead artist ===
List of singles as lead artist, with selected chart positions and certifications, showing year released and album name
Title	Year	Peak chart positions										Certifications	Album
Title	Year	NOR	AUS	FIN	FRA	GER	ITA	NZ	SWE	SWI	UK	Certifications	Album
"Unforgivable Sinner"	1998	1	48	—	37	78	1	32	4	—	13	IFPI NOR: Platinum; IFPI SWE: Gold	Playing My Game
"Sitting Down Here"	1999	2	54	4	48	57	5	4	18	—	5	IFPI NOR: Gold; BPI: Gold	Playing My Game
"Where I'm Headed"	1999	—	—	7	5	—	1	—	35	28	31	SNEP: Gold	Playing My Game
"You Weren't There"	2003	1	—	—	89	—	1	—	39	74	59		Another Day
"Another Day"	2003	—	—	—	—	—	17	—	—	—	—		Another Day
"Sorry"	2003	—	—	—	—	—	41	—	—	—	—		Another Day
"How Would It Be"	2005	11	—	—	—	95	16	—	—	—	—		Lost in a Moment
"What If"	2005	—	—	—	—	—	—	—	—	—	—		Lost in a Moment
"Still Here"	2006	—	—	—	—	—	—	—	—	—	—		Lost in a Moment
"Here We Are"	2009	6	—	—	—	—	—	—	—	—	—		Twist the Truth
"You Could Have"	2009	—	—	—	—	—	—	—	—	—	—		Twist the Truth
"Is It True"	2013	18	—	—	—	—	—	—	—	—	—		Non-album singles
"Kanskje du behøver noen"	2013	18	—	—	—	—	—	—	—	—	—		Non-album singles
"Engler i sneen" (with Kurt Nilsen)	2013	7	—	—	—	—	—	—	—	—	—		Non-album singles
"—" denotes a recording that did not chart or was not released in that territory.

=== As featured artist ===
List of singles as featured artist, with selected chart positions and certifications, showing year released and album name
Title	Year	Peak chart positions		Certifications	Album
Title	Year	NOR	SWI	Certifications	Album
"Avalon" (Lovebugs featuring Lene Marlin)	2006	13	10		In Every Waking Moment
"Worth It" (Aleksander With featuring Lene Marlin)	2009	3	—	IFPI NOR: Gold	Still Awake
"—" denotes a recording that did not chart or was not released in that territory.

== Video albums ==
Title	Details
Another Day	Released: 22 September 2003; Label: Virgin; Format: DVD
