= List of public art in Ashland, Oregon =

List of public artworks in Ashland, Oregon, U.S.

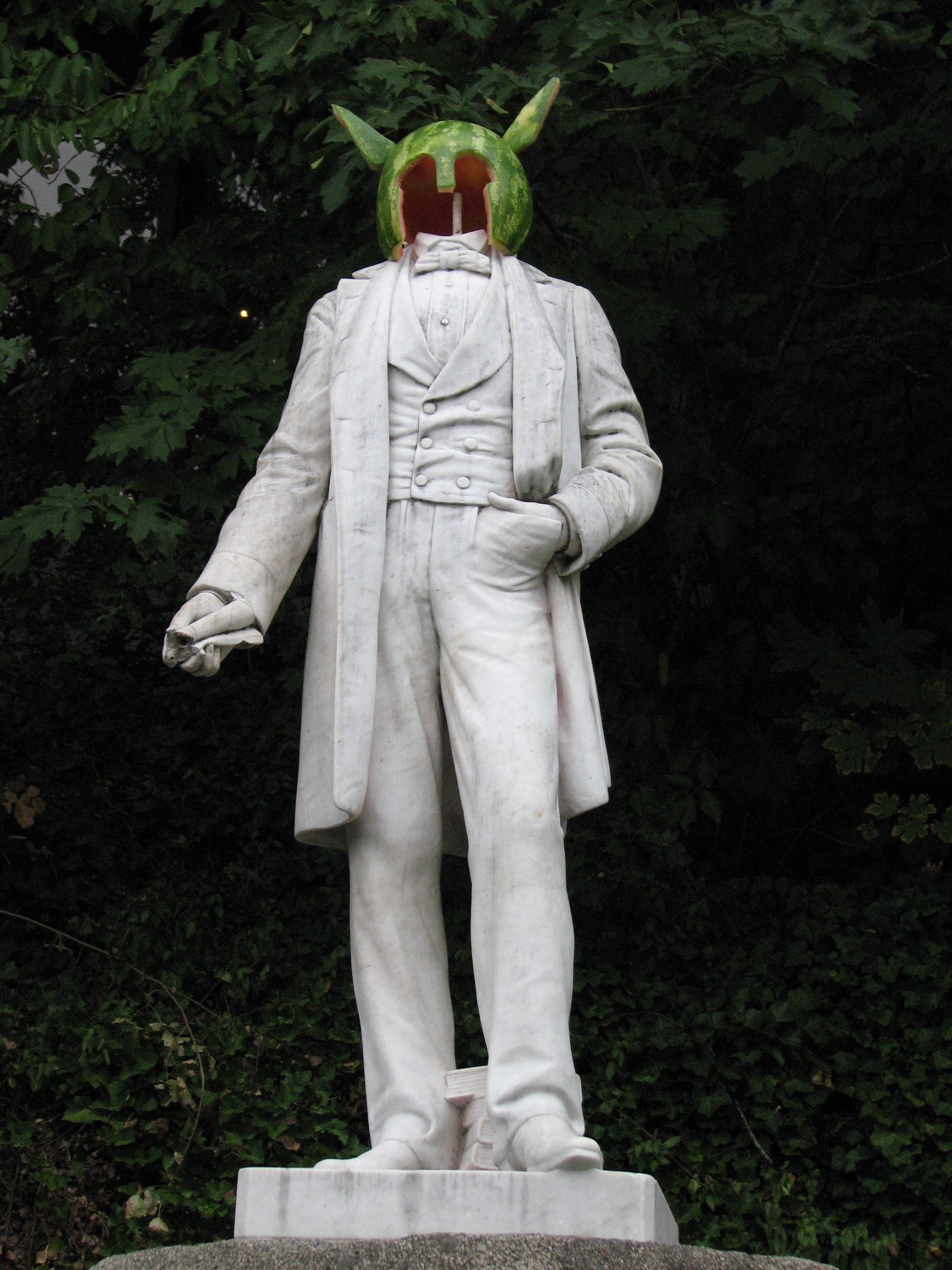
Decapitated statue of Abraham Lincoln by Antonio Frilli

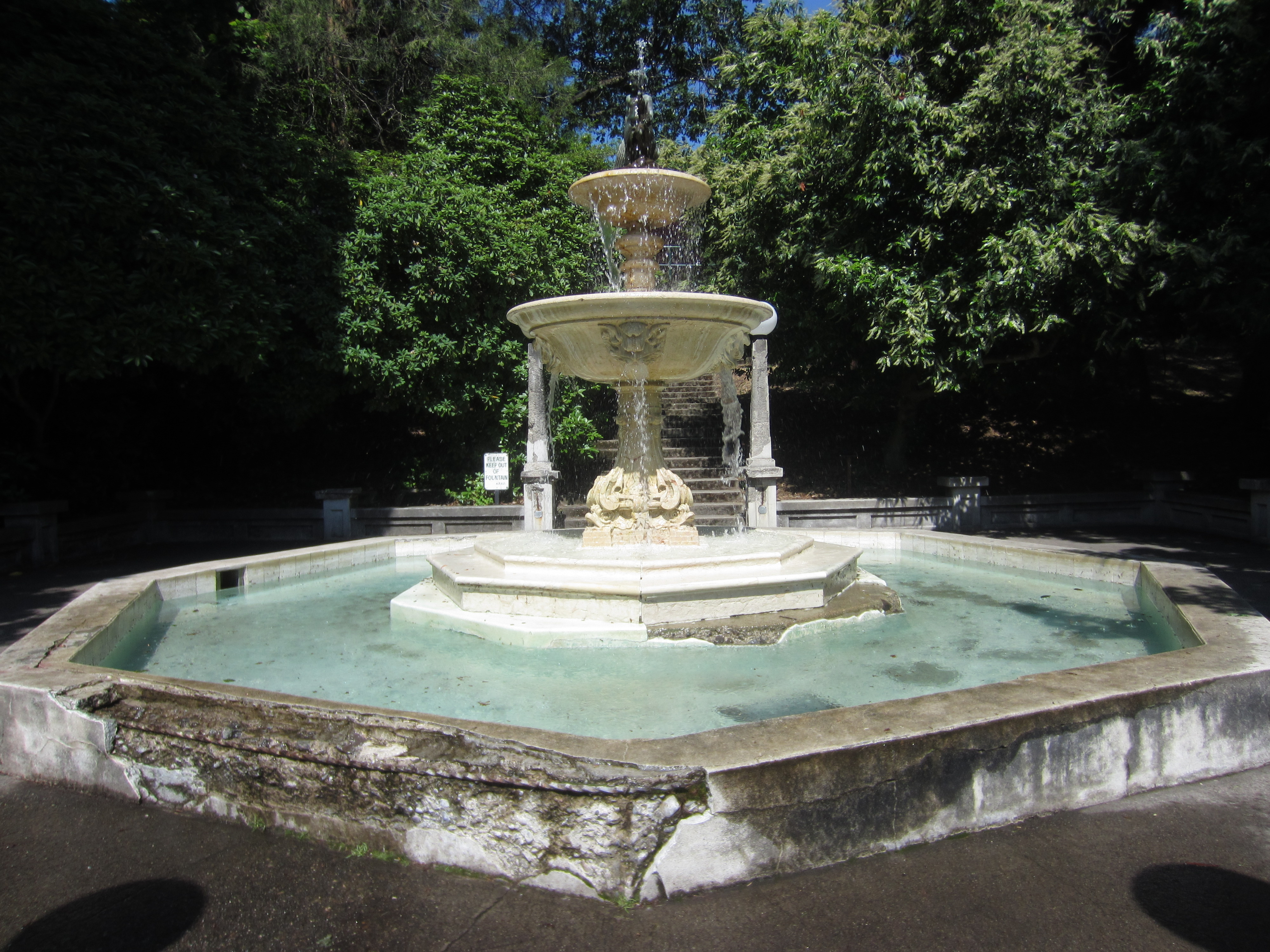
Butler-Perozzi Fountain, 2019

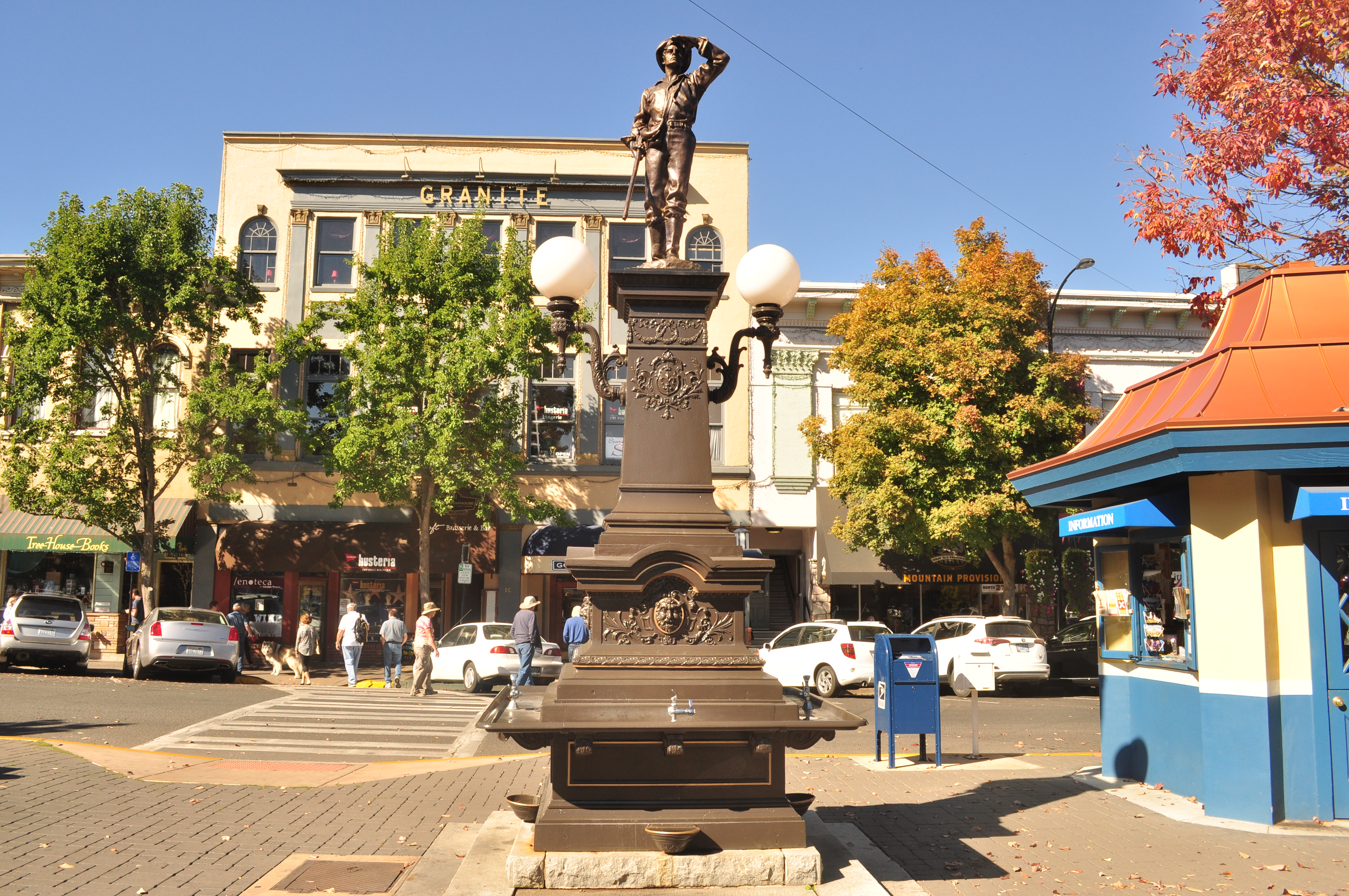
Carter Memorial Fountain, 2016

Following are public artworks installed in Ashland, Oregon, United States:

- Ashland Streetscape and Hills by Nicole Shulters (2012)
- Butler-Perozzi Fountain (1915), marble
- Carter Memorial Fountain (1910), features the statue Pioneer Mike
- Ceramic Frieze by Susan Springer (2013)
- Compass Rose by Susan Springer (2011)
- Cubs at Play by Sarah Mayer (2003), bronze
- Elevation by Cheryl Garcia (2018), steel
- Ethel E. Reid by Thomas Knudsen (1973), bronze
- Fall Splendor by Annette Julien (2015)
- Gift (2009)
- Inorganic Compound by Kevin Christman (2009)
- Las Calles de Guatajuato (2016), mural
- Mickelson-Chapman Fountain (1929)
- Nourishing Our Community by Lonnie Feather (2006), basalt and glass
- Open Minded by CJ Rench (2013), steel
- Pacific Fisher by Jeremy Crisswell (2015), ceramic mosaic and steel
- Pathway to Goodness and Light (2009), painted panels
- Peace Fence (2010)
- Rio Amistad by Susan Springer (2005), ceramic and glass mosaic
- Seasons of Gratitude by Denise Baxter (2014)
- Statue of Abraham Lincoln
- Street Scene by Marion Young (1993), bronze
- Threshold by Susan Zoccola (2018)
- Velocity by Gordon Huether (2018)
- Water Is Life by Karen Rycheck (2017), mosaic cairn
- We Are Here
