= Here We Are =

Here We Are may refer to:

== Albums ==
- Here We Are (Heroes album), 1987
- Here We Are (A Global Threat album), 2002
- Here We Are (Yoomiii album), 2006

== Songs ==
- "Here We Are" (Gloria Estefan song), 1989
- "Here We Are" (Alabama song), 1991
- "Here We Are", song from the Breaking Benjamin album Phobia, 2006
- "Here We Are", song from the Lene Marlin album Twist the Truth, 2009
- "Here We Are", song from the Fray album Scars & Stories, 2012
- "Here We Are", track from the Toby Fox video game soundtrack Undertale, 2015
- "Here We Are", theme song for Singapore National Day Parade 2025

== Other uses ==
- "Here We Are" (short story), 1931 short story by Dorothy Parker
- Here We Are (one-act play), stage adaptation of the Dorothy Parker story
- Here We Are!, 1979 Estonian comedy film
- Here We Are (novel), 2020 novel by Graham Swift
- Here We Are (film), 2020 Israeli-Italian drama
- Here We Are (musical), with score by Stephen Sondheim and book by David Ives, first performed in 2023
- "Here We Are", a storyline in the science fiction comedy webtoon series Live with Yourself!

== See also ==
- We Are Here (disambiguation)
