= We Are Here =

We Are Here may refer to:

- We Are Here (collective), an Amsterdam-based group of migrants campaigning for improved treatment
- We Are Here (Apparatjik album) (2010)
- We Are Here (Flower Travellin' Band album) (2008)
- "We Are Here" (song), a 2014 song by Alicia Keys
  - We Are Here Movement, a non-profit organization created by Alicia Keys
- We Are Here (sculpture), in Ashland, Oregon
- We Are Here, a 2017 short film written by Troian Bellisario

== See also ==
- Here We Are (disambiguation)
- We're Here, a 2020 reality TV series on HBO
