= Statue of Abraham Lincoln (Ashland, Oregon) =

Statue in Ashland, Oregon, U.S.

- The statue of Abraham Lincoln in Lithia Park
- Artist: Antonio Frilli
- Year: 1915
- Medium: Marble sculpture
- Subject: Abraham Lincoln
- Location: Ashland, Oregon, United States; 42.1960°N 122.7162°W

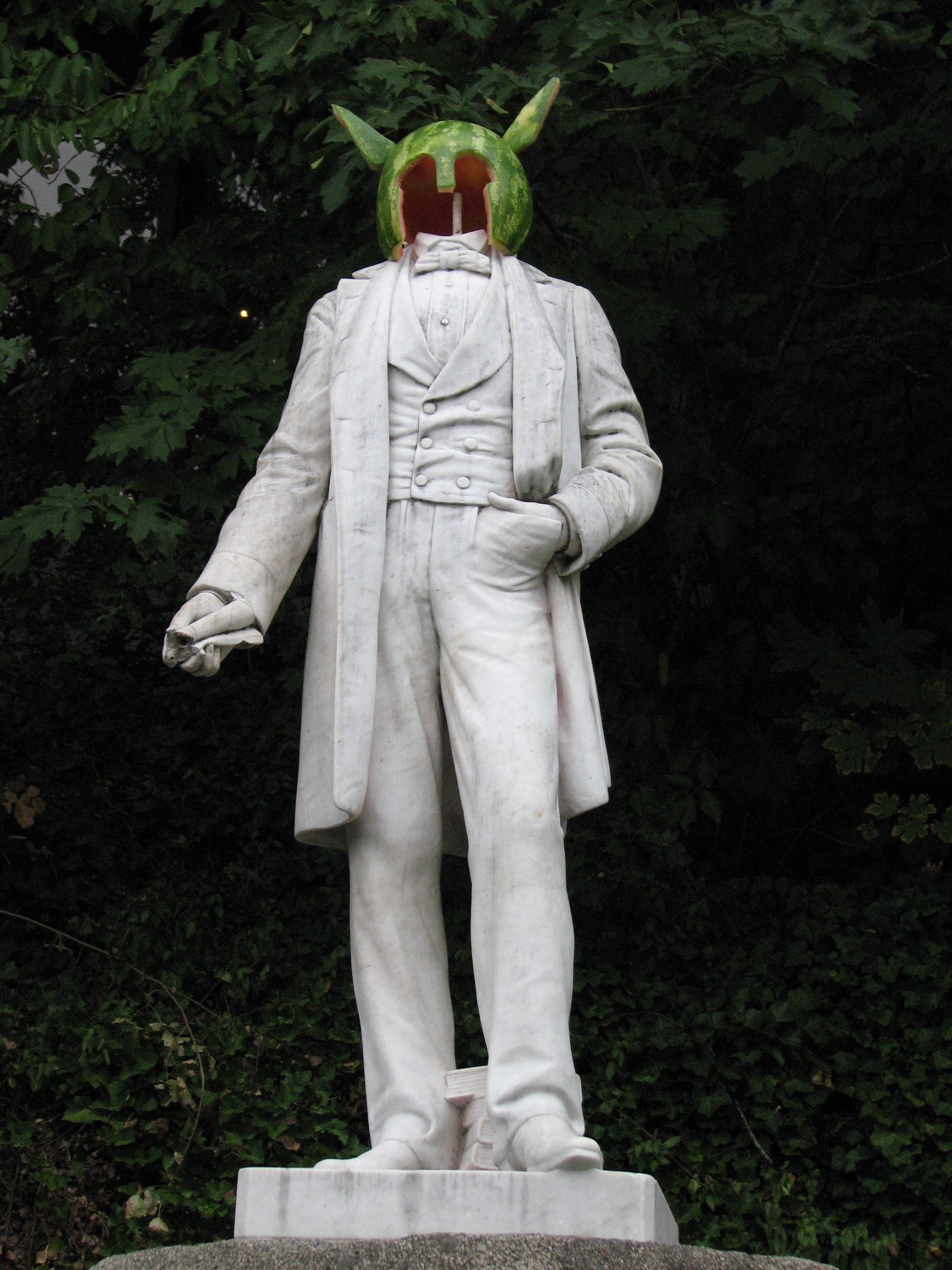
The headless statue of Abraham Lincoln in Lithia Park in 2006

A 1915 marble statue of Abraham Lincoln by Antonio Frilli is installed in Ashland, Oregon's Lithia Park, in the United States. The statue was gifted to the city by Gwin S. Butler, who dedicated the artwork as a memorial to his stepfather, pioneer Jacob Thompson, in 1916.

== Description ==
The statue is a standing figure of Lincoln with books stacked on his proper left foot. He wears an unbuttoned coat and holds a scroll in his proper right hand. The marble sculpture measures approximately 5 x 2 x 1 1/3 ft and rests on a granite base measuring approximately 4 ft, 4 in tall. One bronze plaque reads:

IN MEMORY / OF / JACOB THOMPSON / PIONEER OF / 1847

Another reads:

ABRAHAM LINCOLN / DONATED TO THE CITY OF ASHLAND IN 1915 BY / GWIN S. BUTLER / IN MEMORY OF HIS STEPFATHER / JACOB THOMPSON / ORIGINALLY SCULPTED IN FLORENCE, ITALY BY / A. FRILLI / EXTENSIVE RESORTATION (sic) IN 1990 BY / JEFFRY BERNARD.

== History ==
The statue was created in 1915. It was originally installed near Butler-Perozzi Fountain and was later relocated to the Oregon Shakespeare Festival and eventually Lithia Park. It has been vandalized several times, including in 1958 and the beheading of the statue in 1967. The artwork was surveyed as part of the Smithsonian Institution's "Save Outdoor Sculpture!" program in 1993. It was beheaded once again in 2008 and removed from the park for repairs.

== See also ==
- 1915 in art
- Memorials to Abraham Lincoln
