= Mañana (band) =

Swiss band

- Origin: Basel, Switzerland
- Genres: Indie pop; Indie rock; Piano rock
- Years active: 2002–present
- Label: Inside Agency
- Members: Manuel Bürkli; Jan Krattiger; Jenny Jans; Samuel Burri; Lorenz Hunziker

Mañana (stylized as *Mañana) is a band from Basel, Switzerland. It is a five-piece band, with Manuel Bürkli performing the vocals and guitar, Jan Krattiger on guitar, Jenny Jans on piano, Samuel Burri on bass, and Lorenz Hunziker on drums.

== History ==
Mañana was founded by Manuel Bürkli and Jan Krattiger (an acoustic duo) when they were joined by bassist Samuel Burri, pianist Stephan Bader and drummer Lorenz Hunziker. They started performing in venues around Basel in 2003. They were subsequently signed by the label Inside Agency, and soon begun recording some of their songs. They then started opening for bands including I Am Kloot, Keane, Mew and A-ha.

Mañana's first record, Fast Days EP, was released in December 2003 throughout Switzerland. It contained five tracks which the band had recently recorded. The band was then able to gain worldwide exposure with their signature track, "Miss Evening", being featured on the soundtrack of FIFA 2005. The song, which had been getting frequent airplay in Switzerland and around Europe, was heard by hundreds of thousands of people, who would form the basis of their wide and dedicated fan base.

In late 2004, "Miss Evening" was released around Switzerland as Mañana's first single. But to combat the increasing global demands for their music, their Fast Days EP and "Miss Evening" singles were soon released for legal download on iTunes, Sony Connect and Amazon. The CD version of the EP was a hot seller at the Virgin Megastore in New York's Times Square, where staff made a Mañana shelf display.

Feeling that their popularity had grown enough, Mañana embarked on their first ever tour, of Northern Europe in Autumn 2005. This included nine shows in Germany, Austria, The Netherlands and Sweden. They finished the tour with five shows in England, including Liverpool's Cavern Club and headlined the Dublin Castle in London's hipster paradise of Camden Town.

A new album has been in planning since early-2005 under the guidance of Swiss label Coffee, and in August 2007 it was announced that they would begin recording their album, in both Basel and Hamburg. Demos of their new songs Time/Gently and Some Kid have been played on Mañana's MySpace page, however.

In recent times, Mañana has been performing in numerous festivals and events around Switzerland.

Mañana released their debut full album (Interruptions) in August 2008.

Under unknown circumstances, Stephan Bader left the band sometime after the release of Fast Days. Jenny Jans currently fills his role.

Following a 15-year hiatus, Manana announced they would resume touring with confirmation they will perform at the 2024 Glastonbury Festival.

== Musical style and influences ==
Mañana play an essential alternative rock, with heavy influences from indie pop and indie rock.

They are influenced by British bands Doves, U2 and The Verve. In more recent times they have looked up to their fellow Swiss band Lovebugs. The band says it is their goal to create "their own style". Despite being from Switzerland, almost all of Mañana's lyrics are in English.

== Discography ==
=== Albums ===
==== Interruptions (2008) ====
1. Loyalty
2. Unbalance
3. Make A Tiger
4. Broken Solid Side
5. Monster
6. Red
7. Elephant
8. Little Lights
9. Berliner Blau
10. Roadside Museum

=== EPs ===
==== Fast Days (2005) ====
1. Fast Days
2. Miss Evening
3. There It Goes
4. English Garden
5. Funny Faces

=== Singles ===
From Fast Days:

- "Miss Evening" (2005)

From Interruptions:

- "Make A Tiger" (2008)
- "Unbalance" (2009)
