= Perozzi =

- 10027 Perozzi, a minor planet
- Christina Perozzi and Hallie Beaune, pair of authors, who together maintain the website TheBeerChicks.com
- Teresa Perozzi, a retired Bermudian boxer and former WBA female middleweight champion
- Butler-Perozzi Fountain, a fountain in Ashland, Oregon, United States
