= You Weren't There (song) =

2003 single by Lene Marlin

Single by Lene Marlin

from the album Another Day
- B-side: "Enough"
- Released: 5 September 2003
- Length: 3:29
- Label: Virgin
- Songwriter: Lene Marlin
- Producer: Mike Hedges

Lene Marlin singles chronology
"Where I'm Headed" (1999)	"You Weren't There" (2003)	"Another Day" (2003)

Music video
- "You Weren't There" on YouTube

"You Weren't There" is a song by Norwegian singer-songwriter Lene Marlin. Written by Marlin and produced by Mike Hodges, the song was released as the first single from Marlin's second studio album, Another Day (2003). The song premiered on French and Italian radio stations on 18 July 2003 and was serviced to European and Asian radio the following week, eventually receiving a single release on 5 September 2003.

"You Weren't There" became Marlin's last hit outside Norway and Italy; it reached number one in both countries but remained a minor hit across the rest of Europe, reaching the top 40 in Sweden and the top 100 in France, Switzerland, and the United Kingdom. The song's music video, which shows a romantic couple having fun at a lake and Marlin singing, received negative reviews for Marlin's lacklustre appearance.

== Lyrical content ==
Lyrically, the song outlines events in the lives of several children, but someone playing an important role in their lives—possibly a parent or an ex-lover—is not with them to witness their victories and tragedies, living far away. The children have been distressed by these absences, worrying that they will miss the specific people every time they close their eyes. The first verse is about a girl who wins a game after a long period of longing for the win, but a specific person is not there to share in her happiness, even though she tried to make this person proud.

In the second verse, a boy celebrates his birthday, receiving gifts and phone calls, but does not receive anything from an unknown person, which has been a regular occurrence for several years. Next, a girl get a paper-cut and is upset when she sees her blood, but no one is there to make her feel better. The fourth verse describes a boy crying from a broken heart, and the narrator asks how loud he has to cry for an absent individual to hear him. The final verse mentions what these people did cannot be undone, and that the children make up stories about them and long for their return.

== Release ==
"You Weren't There" was serviced to European and Asian radio stations on 28 July 2003 while the HDCD single was issued on 5 September 2003. Due to Marlin's popularity in France and Italy, the song received its radio premiere in these countries on 18 July 2003 around 3:30 in the afternoon, immediately after radio stations had obtained the song. The track premiered early due to popular demand from Marlin's fanbase and because radio playlists would be closed for the holidays during its originally scheduled release date.

== Commercial performance ==
The song made its first chart appearance on the Norwegian Singles Chart on the 38th chart week of 2003, corresponding to early September, debuting at number one and replacing fellow Norwegian singer David's song "Wild at Heart" at the top spot. It spent another week at number one before "Wild at Heart" returned to number one, knocking "You Weren't There" to number three on chart week 40. The song spent three more weeks in the top 10 before falling to number 11 on week 45. It stayed in the top 20 for four more weeks before dropping off the chart.

In Italy, the song also debuted at number one on 11 September, dethroning Evanescence's "Bring Me to Life". The next week, the song dropped to number five, then to number seven the week after. It returned to number five on 2 October, but moved down to number nine the following week. On 16 October, the single rose up to number four before dropping out of the top 10 on 23 October. It returned to the top 10 for the final week at number 10 on 13 November. For the next four weeks, it fluctuated around the top 20 until leaving the chart from number 19 on 11 December. It was Italy's 21st-best-selling hit of the year.

Outside Norway and Italy, the song did not make a major impact in Europe. In late September, the song debuted and peaked at number 39 on Sweden's Sverigetopplistan chart (then named Hitlistan), becoming Lene Marlin's final top-40 single there. In Switzerland the same month, the song first appeared on the Schweizer Hitparade chart at number 89 on 28 September, then peaked at number 74 the following week, spending six non-consecutive weeks on the chart altogether. Also on 28 September, the song debuted at number 59 on the UK Singles Chart, but dropped out of the top 100 the week after, becoming her final chart hit there. It was also her last hit in France, where it charted for a single week at number 89 on 2 November.

== Music video ==
=== Synopsis ===
A music video was made for "You Weren't There". The first scene depicts a girl waking up on a platform overlooking a lake with a picture in her hand, but when she steps up to the railing and looks at the photograph, the wind rips it out of her hands and blows it away, to her visible disappointment. It then cuts to Marlin singing the opening verse in a small, empty classroom, followed by the girl from the opening seen having romantic moments with the man in the photograph. During the chorus, the lovers are shown happily jumping into the lake, then sitting on dry ground sharing a kiss. Marlin is then seen singing on the platform by the lake and in an alley as the couple work together to shoot a basketball into the hoop. As Marlin continues to sing on the basketball court, the couple sit and talk at a bus stop with sad expressions on their faces. The two are then seen hugging at a train station, where the girl boards a train and the man sees her off. During this time, Marlin sings on the platform from the beginning. The video finishes with shots of the empty classroom, the pier where the couple jumped into the lake, and the platform on the body of water.

=== Reception ===
The video premiered on NRK television programme Lørdagsrevyen on 26 July 2003 and received negative reviews from music critics. Siri Høstmælingen of music programme Lydverket said that Marlin did not give a notable performance while Natt&Dag music editor Audun Vinger called the video "tame and boring", saying that Marlin appeared "distracted, withdrawn, and uncomfortable" and comparing her look to that of a widow's. Critic Finn Bjelke gave the video a G+ grade, and NRK music director Håkon Moslet noted that Marlin looks older and more serious than intended but complimented her appearance.

== Track listings ==
Norwegian HDCD single

1. "You Weren't There" – 3:29
2. "Enough" – 3:53

German and Australian HDCD single

1. "You Weren't There" – 3:29
2. "Enough" – 3:53
3. "You Weren't There" (remix) – 3:20

European CD single

1. "You Weren't There" – 3:29
2. "Sitting Down Here" – 3:55

UK DVD-V single

1. "You Weren't There" (video)
2. "Sitting Down Here" (audio)
3. "Enough" (audio)
4. "You Weren't There" (performance video)

== Personnel ==
Personnel are taken from the Norwegian HDCD single liner notes.

- Lene Marlin – words, music, vocals
- Rick J Parfitt – guitars
- Jesper Mattsson – bass
- Pete Davis – keyboards and programming
- Makoto Sakamoto – drums
- Martin Ditcham – percussion
- Mike Hedges – production
- Ger McDonnell – recording, mixing
- Matthieu Clouard – Pro Tools engineering
- Robbie Nelson – engineering assistant
- Olly Henshall – engineering assistant
- James Sanger – additional programming

== Charts ==
=== Weekly charts ===
Chart (2003)	Peak position
France (SNEP)	89
Italy (FIMI)	1
Norway (VG-lista)	1
Scotland Singles (OCC)	61
Sweden (Sverigetopplistan)	39
Switzerland (Schweizer Hitparade)	74
UK Singles (OCC)	59

=== Year-end charts ===
Chart (2003)	Position
Italy (FIMI)	21

== Release history ==
Region	Date	Format(s)	Label(s)	Ref(s).
France	18 July 2003	Radio	Virgin	
Italy	18 July 2003	Radio	Virgin	
Norway	21 July 2003	Radio	Virgin	
Europe	28 July 2003	Radio	Virgin	
Asia	28 July 2003	Radio	Virgin	
Europe	5 September 2003	HDCD	Virgin	
Norway	8 September 2003	HDCD	Virgin	
United Kingdom	22 September 2003	CD; DVD	Virgin	
Australia	13 October 2003	HDCD	Virgin	
