= We Are Here (collective) =

Human rights campaign of migrants in Amsterdam

- Wij Zijn Hier
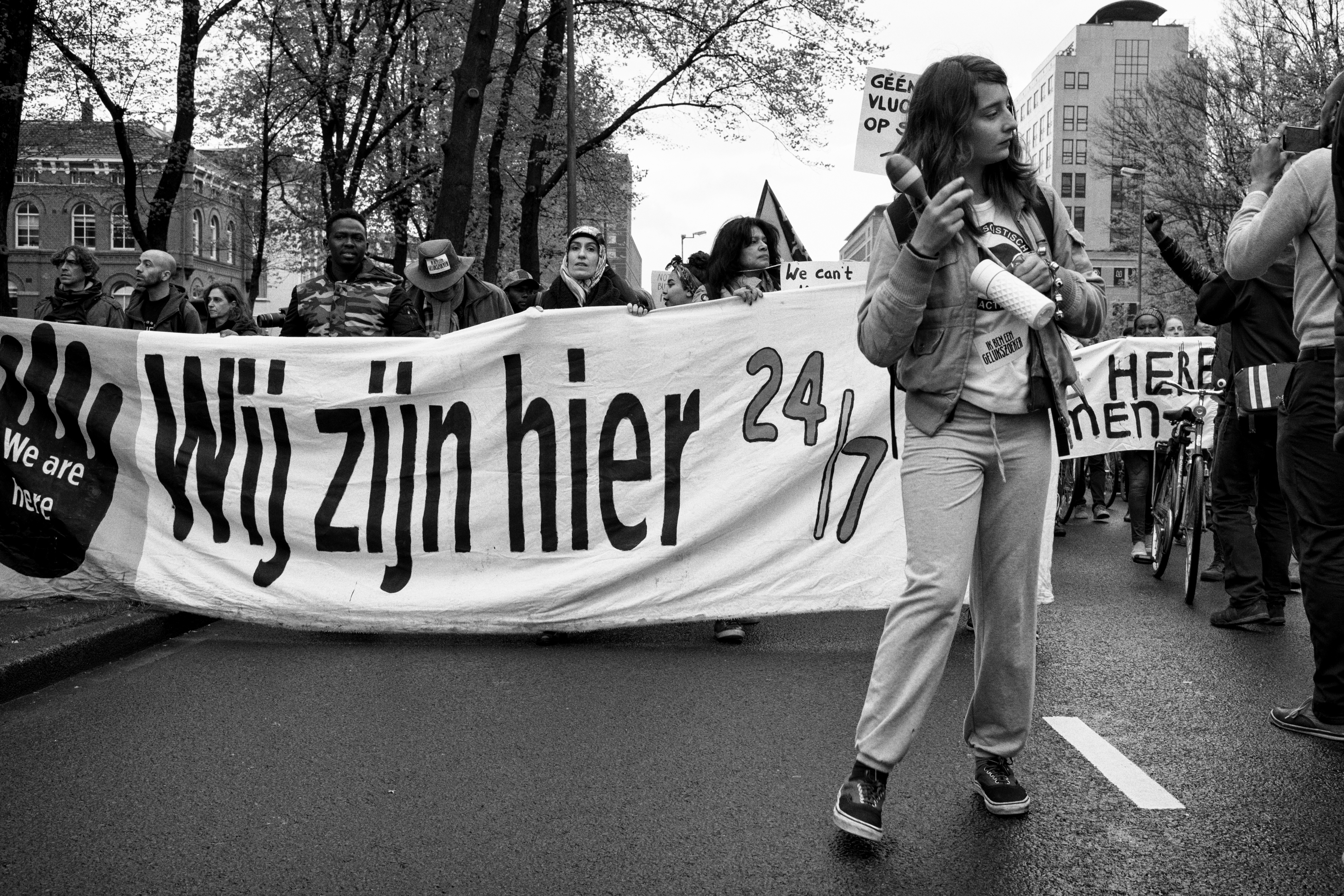
- Banner at 2018 demonstration

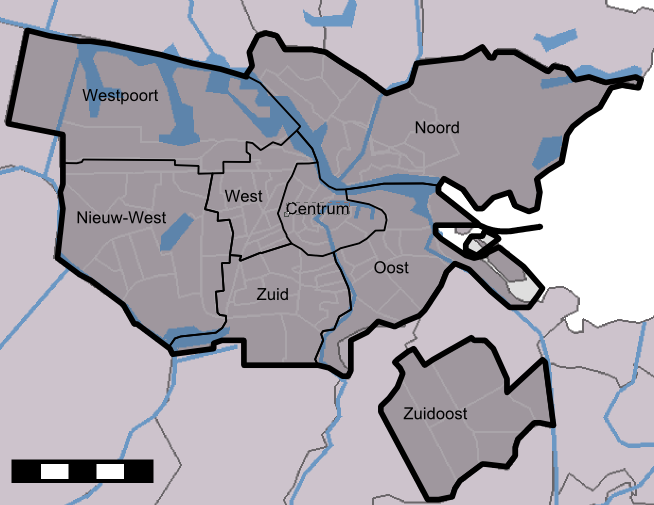
- Boroughs of Amsterdam
- Abbreviation: WZH
- Formation: September 4, 2012; 13 years ago
- Founded at: Garden of Diakonie, Amsterdam
- Purpose: Rights for migrants
- Location: Amsterdam
- Methods: Campaigning, Demonstrations, Direct Action, Squatting
- Website: wijzijnhier.org

We Are Here (Dutch: Wij Zijn Hier) is a collective of migrants based in Amsterdam, the Netherlands, which campaigns for human rights for its members and all undocumented migrants. The asylum seekers have in many cases had their applications to remain in the Netherlands denied but they either cannot go back or refuse to return to their country of origin. They demand access to social services such as medical care and housing. The group formed in 2012 and by 2015 contained over 200 migrants from around 15 countries.

The collective is constantly in flux as a result of individually precarious legal situations. Since its members refuse to use the homeless shelters offered by the city of Amsterdam, which can only be used from 5 p.m. until 9 a.m., the collective has squatted a chain of buildings in and around the city since 2012. Most buildings are quickly evicted, some have led to offshoot projects. The group is mostly composed of men originally from Africa, although there have also been women-only occupations. There have been some successes, such as the Vluchtmaat, where a long-term deal was negotiated with the owner, and some long-term squats such as the Vluchtgarage, where Amsterdam city council tolerated the occupation. As of 2017, roughly one hundred people from the group had gained Dutch residence permits.

By 2018, the new council had pledged to set up 24 hour shelters for up to 500 undocumented migrants, but We Are Here stated it was against the hostels since they were only for a short time period and it disputed the plan to send asylum seekers back to their country of origin at the end of the project. The collective has diversified into different subgroups occupying different buildings, such as a women-only group, a Swahili language group, and a group composed of people mainly from Ethiopia, Eritrea and Sudan.

== Background ==
Refugees seeking asylum in the Netherlands are assessed by the Immigration and Naturalisation Service and then either gain residency or fail to do so, based on their documentary evidence. For some who have fled warzones, it is difficult to provide documents or other proof for their claim. If the refugees fail to be granted asylum, they are given temporary housing and have 28 days to leave. Some people fall into what human rights groups term the "asylum gap" since they are unable to return to their country of origin, whilst others want to go back but cannot because they do not possess the required visas or identity documents. In 2016, it was estimated there were 35,000 undocumented migrants in the Netherlands. Without a residence permit they are denied access to social services such as healthcare and housing.

By the end of 2017, the migrants of the We Are Here collective had occupied over 30 buildings and parks. They argue that they should have access to basic needs such as housing and healthcare. The city council of Amsterdam refuses to accede to their demands. Much of the dispute with the council is that it only offers the so-called BBB service – Bed-Bath-Bread (Dutch: bed-bad-broodvoorziening) – that is to say an overnight accommodation open from 5 p.m. until 9 a.m., which cannot be stayed in during the day. The migrants reject this offer as insufficient and comment that the service is also often over-subscribed. The city council argues that its actions are limited by the policy of the Dutch Government. Therefore, We Are Here have chosen to squat a number of buildings to live in. By 2019, the total had risen to over 50 squats, according to the group. The occupations are tracked on a map hosted on the We Are Here website.

We Are Here is mostly composed of men originally from Africa. In some squats, such as the Vluchtgarage occupation, the collective has been men only. However, there have also been women only squats. The group's membership changes often since people are often being deported or detained. Overall, representatives of the group estimated that over one hundred people had gained residence permits by 2017. A spokesperson for the group, Khalid Jone, who escaped war in Sudan and had lived in the Netherlands for 16 years, was granted a residence permit in 2018. The collective regularly makes demonstrations highlighting the plight of individuals. It has also set up the We Are Here Academy, a scheme to offer university level qualifications for undocumented migrants.

In 2018, a newly elected Amsterdam city council, now controlled by a centre-left coalition of GroenLinks, D66, PvdA and SP, decided to go against the will of the Parliament and set up a 24-hour shelter for homeless failed asylum seekers. However, We Are Here as a group announced it would not make use of the shelter, since it would only exist for a maximum time of eighteen months and afterwards participants would be required to return to their country of origin. Since We Are Here was set up for people unable to return to their motherland, a spokesman said the plan offered no real solution. In March 2019, the council announced seven prospective sites for its plan to set up shelters for undocumented migrants. It was considering up to 23 sites, with around 30 beds at each. The cities of Rotterdam, Utrecht, Groningen and Eindhoven stated that they were all also looking for sites.

Femke Halsema, previously parliamentary leader of GroenLinks, started serving a six-year term as Mayor of Amsterdam in July 2018. In 2019, she discussed making the enforcement of the Dutch squatting ban tougher and suggested that the immigration police could be employed to stop the We Are Here collective squatting. GroenLinks asked for clarification since the tradition in Amsterdam is that illegal migrants are not searched for by the police. Halsema stated that if We Are Here members did nothing wrong they had nothing to fear, but that squatting was a criminal offence. GroenLinks stated it was troubled by this position.

== Significant occupations ==
=== 2012–2017 ===
We Are Here coalesced as a group in 2012, when a small number of asylum seekers whose claims had been rejected began a protest camp at the garden of the Diakonie on the Nieuwe Herengracht in the Grachtengordel in central Amsterdam. More migrants joined the protest, which then moved location to Notweg in Osdorp. The camp swelled to 130 people and received national media attention. The camp was evicted on 30 November. Everyone was arrested and some people were held in foreign detention (Dutch: vreemdelingendetentie).

After a few nights staying at the Vondelpark Bunker and OT301, the group squatted an empty church in Bos en Lommer. This became known as the Vluchtkerk, a portmanteau of the Dutch words for migrant (Dutch: vluchteling) and church (Dutch: kerk). This began the tradition of giving every new location a nickname, by adding 'Vlucht' to the type of place. The Vluchtkerk again generated a lot of media attention in the Netherlands. Celebrities such as popstar Anouk made solidarity performances.

The Vluchtkerk was occupied until 31 May 2013. Mayor of Amsterdam Eberhard van der Laan then asked the group to leave a building they had squatted on the Weteringschans and the council offered the migrants the possibility to stay in a former prison for 6 months. Many people refused, citing bad prior experiences of prisons, but 75 others took the opportunity and it became known as the Vluchthaven. Only migrants who signed up with the Dutch Refugee Council were eligible to stay there. By the end of the period, a total of 165 people had stayed in the prison. Of these, three had returned to their country of origin, three more were planning to, twelve had successfully gained residency, one person had died and the largest group (38) was formed by those still gathering documents for their asylum process. In terms of country of origin, the largest numbers of people were from Somalia (48), Eritrea (31) and Ethiopia (28).

On 13 December 2013, a building in Amsterdam Zuid Oost was occupied by a group of 90 migrants and their supporters. It was a derelict parking garage with offices attached, which became known as the Vluchtgarage. It was occupied until April 2015. In August 2014, a Somali man called Nassir Guuleed died at the squat. A few days later, Ibrahim Touré from Côte d'Ivoire suffered a brain haemorrhage and broken vertebra when he fell off a stairway. Police and ambulance services refused to enter the building, citing fears of the presence of asbestos, though the city had found none in an inspection earlier that same day. The severely injured man was carried to the ambulance. Fred Teeven, Undersecretary for Security and Justice announced his intention to evict the Vluchtgarage in January 2015. At this point there were around 100 people living there. Following the eviction in April 2015, people camped on land in the De Pijp neighbourhood but were moved on by the council.

By 2015, We Are Here was composed in total of around 225 migrants from about 15 countries. As well as occupying several buildings, they regularly made demonstrations demanding rights. At each squat, the collective was helped out by local people who donated things. If something was needed, a request was made on the website or on Facebook. Often things were scavenged from the street. The Vluchtmaat was occupied in 2015 by 40 migrants mainly from Ethiopia and Eritrea. The building had formerly been used by the construction company Bouwmaat. Unusually, the owner did not want to evict the squatters but came to an arrangement with them whereby they could stay for a fixed time as long as the building costs were paid. The security of short-term tenure allowed the former squatters to break the offices up into residential units and spaces which small businesses could rent affordably, thus supplying enough money to pay the costs of electricity, water, insurance and so on. A foundation, Stichting Noodzaak, was set up to deal with the owner. The initial contract was for six months and has since been extended in six month blocks.

Another subgroup of We Are Here is composed of Swahili language speakers. They first squatted on Amstelstraat in the centre of Amsterdam at the end of 2016. They then occupied a disused kindergarten in Amsterdam-Zuidoost in May 2017 and a building on Sarphatistraat in September of the same year. In May 2018, they were occupying the former discotheque Club Empire on Buikslootermeerplein in Amsterdam-Noord.

In April 2017, the We Are Here subgroup composed of men from West Africa, Ethiopia, Eritrea and Sudan occupied a derelict office building on Nienoord street in Diemen. The owner was the Arq Group, which specialises in treating people with severe psychotraumas which cannot be treated by psychologists or psychiatrists. The owner was sympathetic to the squatters but said the building contained asbestos and therefore was unliveable. We Are Here denounced Arq for not making a temporary contract since the building would not be demolished for two years and added that many in the group had actually attended treatment sessions for trauma provided by the group's Equator Foundation. Normally the group would leave a building willingly after a court order or having made an agreement with the owner, but in this case the squatters said they would resist the eviction, since they were tired of constantly moving. The building was evicted in November 2017 by the police, with one arrest. It was the 29th building which had been squatted by We Are Here since 2012. Out of the 90 people evicted, 17 were from Sudan. Some said they had escaped the Darfur genocide, but the immigration authorities had refused their claims.

=== Rudolf Dieselstraat ===
In April 2018, We Are Here occupied eleven apartments and a shop on Rudolf Dieselstraat in Amsterdam-Oost. They renamed the street 'We Are Here Village'. Since the housing corporation, Ymere, had left the apartments empty for some time, they asked that they could stay there until they were demolished. The city council backed their request. The previously unknown street became both a media and political sensation with many actors becoming involved in the debate about whether We Are Here should be able to stay or not.

In Parliament, centre-right parties VVD and CDA demanded that the state took action to evict the squatters. This was in response from a motion at the Amsterdam city council put forward by centre-left parties D66, PvdA, SP and GroenLinks proposing that the council would not put asylum seekers on the street and would ask owners of occupied buildings not to evict migrants. Acting mayor Jozias van Aartsen of the VVD party opposed the motion. He later received criticism from within his party for not taking further action and replied that "You must be very careful with the mayor's office and not go down the route of politicizing the mayor's role." CDA Parliament member Madeleine van Toorenburg stated that "the enforcement of the law [which criminalised squatting] is a joke."

The housing corporation, Ymere, went to court to evict the squatters. The judge decided that Ymere was not demonstrating an immediate need for the buildings, which would eventually be demolished. He stated that the squat action had not disturbed the public order and that the squatters could stay until 1 June. The situation then became more tense when a far-right group announced that they would also occupy a building on the same estate, in protest against We Are Here. Identitair Verzet (a small Dutch branch of Generation Identity) claimed to have squatted a building but Ymere later stated a property guardian had let them into a house. The house was immediately attacked with fireworks and had its windows smashed. The police then evicted the house on grounds of public order. Identitair Verzet had also previously tried to demonstrate against the Vluchtkerk. The houses occupied by the We Are Here collective were subsequently evicted in June.

=== 2018– ===
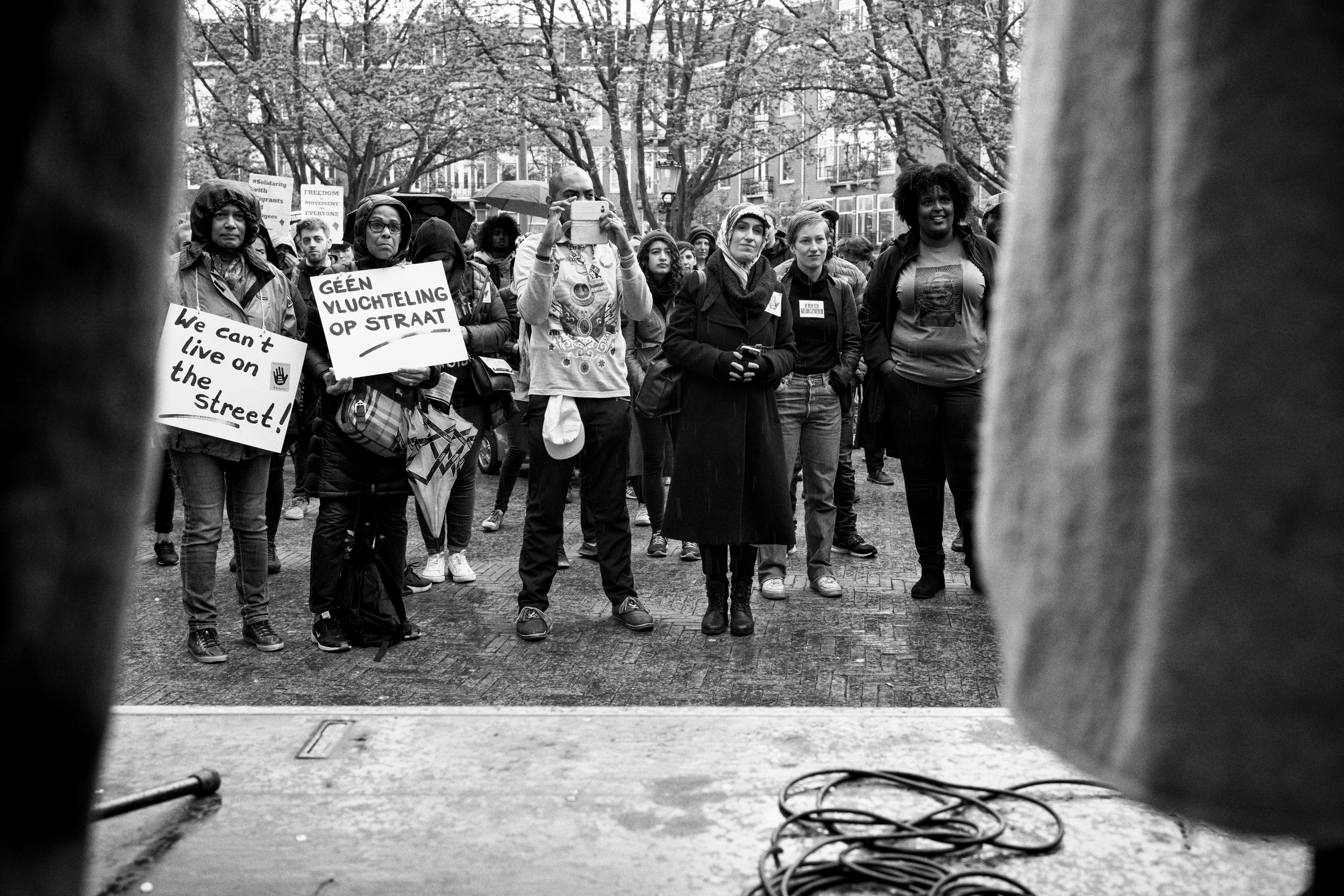
Placards at 2018 demonstration

We Are Here squatted in a building in Amstelveen on Groen van Prinstererlaan in June 2018, having left Rudolf Dieselstraat. They had briefly occupied a former bowling alley in Amsterdam-Noord and failed to squat at Hoog Kadijk and Weesperzijde. They were then given an eviction order for the end of the month.

The Weesperzijde squat action at a former United Nations building became a notorious incident, since the building was actually inhabited. A heated confrontation between We Are Here and a resident, who happened to be the son of the chair of the local branch of the VVD, was filmed and circulated in the press. In April 2019, member of the collective Fortune M. was given a three-day jail sentence and a conditional fine of €150, for damaging a door during the attempt to squat the building.

== In popular culture ==
- 2014: Photographer Manel Quiros won third place in the International Photography Awards with a photoseries following We Are Here.
- 2015–2016: Inspired by meeting members of the We Are Here collective and following them around for several months, Dutch artist Manon van Hoeckel created the Limbo Embassy. This provided a way for people to hear the stories of We Are Here participants. Members of the collective were otherwise not allowed to work or volunteer, but because it was an artistic project they could be paid for performances and sell political printed matter. Between June 2015 to June 2016, the embassy visited 15 events, including the Dutch Design Week in Eindhoven.
- 2015: Alexandra Jansse made an hour-long documentary called Wij Zijn Hier about the group
- 2017: We Are Here featured in the exhibition Architecture of Appropriation at Het Nieuwe Instituut (the Dutch Institute of Architecture), in Rotterdam.
- 2018: Artist Hilda Moucharrafieh won the International Bursary Award at the Amsterdam Fringe Festival for her project Tracing Erased Memories: A parallel walk of Amsterdam & Cairo. She worked with members of We Are Here to make a choreographed roadmap in which a person walked through central Amsterdam wearing headphones and hearing the sounds of someone walking through central Cairo.
- 2018: Academics who have studied We Are Here organised a meeting at Spui 25 cultural centre to discuss their findings with members of the collective and to listen to their feedback.

== See also ==
- Abahlali baseMjondolo
- Calais Jungle
