= Another Day (Lene Marlin album) =

Studio album by Lene Marlin
- Released: 24 September 2003
- Studio: Wessex, London
- Genre: Pop
- Length: 43:44
- Label: Virgin
- Producer: Mike Hedges

Lene Marlin chronology
Playing My Game (1999)	Another Day (2003)	Lost in a Moment (2005)

Singles from Playing My Game
- 1. "You Weren't There" Released: 5 September 2003; 2. "Another Day" Released: 2003; 3. "Sorry" Released: 2003

Another Day is the second studio album by Norwegian singer Lene Marlin. It was released on 24 September 2003 by Virgin Records. The album debuted at number one on the Norwegian Albums Chart, spending 14 weeks on the chart.

== Track listing ==
All tracks are written by Lene Marlin.

No.	Title	Length
1.	"Another Day"	4:07
2.	"Faces"	3:34
3.	"You Weren't There"	3:32
4.	"From This Day"	4:38
5.	"Sorry"	3:51
6.	"My Love"	4:30
7.	"Whatever It Takes"	3:45
8.	"Fight Against the Hours"	6:23
9.	"Disguise"	3:50
10.	"Story"	5:32

Japanese edition bonus track
No.	Title	Length
11.	"Enough"	3:51

== Charts ==
Chart (2003)	Peak position
Danish Albums (Hitlisten)	24
French Albums (SNEP)	38
German Albums (Offizielle Top 100)	59
Italian Albums (FIMI)	3
Norwegian Albums (VG-lista)	1
Scottish Albums (OCC)	78
Swedish Albums (Sverigetopplistan)	26
Swiss Albums (Schweizer Hitparade)	32
UK Albums (OCC)	93

== Sales ==
Sales for Another Day
Region	Sales
Norway	80,000
Worldwide	350,000
