= Lost in a Moment =

Studio album by Lene Marlin
- Released: 13 June 2005
- Genre: Pop rock
- Length: 45:39
- Label: EMI
- Producer: StarGate

Lene Marlin chronology
Another Day (2003)	Lost in a Moment (2005)	Twist the Truth (2009)

Singles from Lost in a Moment
- 1. "How Would It Be" Released: 22 April 2005; 2. "What If" Released: 19 August 2005

Lost in a Moment is the third album by Norwegian musician Lene Marlin. It was released on 13 June 2005.

"My Lucky Day" was used prominently in a 2007 Kinder Surprise television commercial, with on-screen credit to Marlin.

== Track listing ==
All tracks are written by Lene Marlin.

No.	Title	Length
1.	"My Lucky Day"	3:44
2.	"All I Can Say"	4:35
3.	"How Would It Be"	3:55
4.	"Hope You're Happy"	4:17
5.	"What If"	3:51
6.	"Leave My Mind"	4:26
7.	"When You Were Around"	3:51
8.	"Never to Know"	4:04
9.	"Eyes Closed"	3:41
10.	"It's True"	4:00
11.	"Wish I Could"	4:28
12.	"Blanket in a Park" (Japan Bonus Track)	3:29

- The CD+DVD Taiwanese edition also adds "Still Here" as a bonus track.

== Charts ==
Chart (2005)	Peak position
German Albums (Offizielle Top 100)	94
Italian Albums (FIMI)	15
Norwegian Albums (VG-lista)	4
Swiss Albums (Schweizer Hitparade)	33
Taiwan International Albums Chart (G-Music)	4
