= Playing My Game =

1999 studio album by Lene Marlin

Studio album by Lene Marlin
- Released: 22 March 1999
- Recorded: 1998–1999
- Genre: Pop
- Length: 44:19
- Label: Virgin
- Producers: Hans G; Jørn Dahl

Lene Marlin chronology
Playing My Game (1999)	Another Day (2003)

Singles from Playing My Game
- 1. "Unforgivable Sinner" Released: 12 October 1998; 2. "Sitting Down Here" Released: 22 February 1999; 3. "Where I'm Headed" Released: 1999

Alternative cover
- Cover used for UK and other international editions

Playing My Game is the debut studio album by Norwegian singer Lene Marlin, released on 22 March 1999 by Virgin Records.

== Track listing ==
All tracks are written by Lene Marlin.

No.	Title	Length
1.	"Sitting Down Here"	3:55
2.	"Playing My Game"	5:34
3.	"Unforgivable Sinner"	4:00
4.	"Flown Away"	4:08
5.	"The Way We Are"	4:00
6.	"So I See"	4:49
7.	"Maybe I'll Go"	4:37
8.	"Where I'm Headed"	4:11
9.	"One Year Ago"	4:27
10.	"A Place Nearby"	4:10

== Personnel ==
Credits adapted from CD liner notes.

Musicians

- Lene Marlin – vocals (all tracks), arrangements (2, 5), guitar (7)
- Jørn Dahl – arrangements (all tracks), keyboards, piano, programming
- Bjørn Charles Dreyer – guitar (3)
- Hans G – arrangements (5)
- Wallen Mjäland – bass guitar, tambourine
- Stray – guitars (1–6, 8–10)
- Karl Oluf Wennerberg – cymbals, hi-hat, tambourine

Technical

- Jørn Dahl – production, engineering
- Hans G – production, engineering
- Espen Berg – mastering (3)
- Dan Bierton – engineering
- Ian Cooper – mastering (1, 2, 4–10)
- Richard Lowe – engineering
- Erik Stokke – engineering (2, 6–8)

Design

- Mikio Ariga – photography
- Gry Celius – hairstyling
- Masaaki Fukushi – artwork

== Charts ==
=== Weekly charts ===
Weekly chart performance for Playing My Game
Chart (1999–2000)	Peak position
Belgian Albums (Ultratop Wallonia)	49
Dutch Albums (Album Top 100)	65
European Albums (Music & Media)	35
French Albums (SNEP)	10
German Albums (Offizielle Top 100)	76
Irish Albums (IRMA)	44
Italian Albums (FIMI)	9
New Zealand Albums (RMNZ)	8
Norwegian Albums (VG-lista)	1
Scottish Albums (Official Charts)	22
Spanish Albums (AFYVE)	43
Swedish Albums (Sverigetopplistan)	8
Swiss Albums (Schweizer Hitparade)	45
UK Albums (Official Charts)	18

=== Year-end charts ===
1999 year-end chart performance for Playing My Game
Chart (1999)	Position
Swedish Albums & Compilations (Sverigetopplistan)	62

2000 year-end chart performance for Playing My Game
Chart (2000)	Position
UK Albums (OCC)	79

2001 year-end chart performance for Playing My Game
Chart (2001)	Position
UK Albums (OCC)	174

== Certifications ==
Certifications for Playing My Game
Region	Certification	Certified units/sales
France (SNEP)	Platinum	300,000^{*}
Italy (FIMI)	3× Platinum	300,000
Japan (RIAJ)	Gold	100,000^{^}
Norway (IFPI Norway)	3× Platinum	150,000^{*}
Sweden (GLF)	Gold	40,000^{^}
Switzerland (IFPI Switzerland)	Gold	25,000^{^}
United Kingdom (BPI)	Platinum	300,000^{^}
Summaries
Worldwide sales outside of Norway	—	1,000,000
^{*} Sales figures based on certification alone.^{^} Shipments figures based on certification alone.
