= Here We Are (Heroes album) =

1987 studio album by Heroes

Studio album by Heroes
- Released: 1987
- Recorded: 1987
- Genre: Rock music
- Length: 41:07
- Label: RCA Records
- Producer: Richard James Burgess

Singles from Here We Are
- 1. "Driftaway" Released: 1987

Professional ratings
Review scores
Source	Rating
Allmusic	2.5/5 stars

Here We Are is the debut album of Heroes, released by Wang Chung drummer Darren Costin, Michael Casswell, Mike Marshall GB, Chuck Sabo, and Colin Baldry, on RCA Records.

It was originally released in 1987 on LP, cassette, and Compact Disc. Heroes also released one single, "Driftaway", in addition to the band’s debut album.

== Track listing ==
1. "Driftaway" - 4:38
2. "Here We Are" - 4:27
3. "Let Me In" - 3:28
4. "Riverside" - 3:03
5. "Dance Your Blues Away" - 4:40
6. "Living on a Time Bomb" - 3:31
7. "My Heart Beats" - 4:03
8. "Dreams for Lovers" - 4:08
9. "Face to Face" - 3:42
10. "That is Love" - 4:35

== Personnel ==
- Lead Vocals: Darren Costin
- Lead Vocals on “Face to Face”: Darren Costin & Michael Casswell
- Additional Vocals: Michael Casswell, Darren Costin, Kevin Dorsey, Lisa Fischer, Paulette McWilliams, Maxayne Moriguchi
- Guitars: Michael Casswell
- Bass Guitars: Colin Baldry
- Bass Keys: Mike Marshall
- Drums: Chuck Sabo
- Keyboards: Mike Marshall
- Piano: Darren Costin
- Trumpet: Gary Grant, Jerry Hey
- Tenor Sax: Marc Russo (appears courtesy of MCA Records)
- Trombone: Bill Reichenbach Jr.
- Main Arranger: Darren Costin
- Horn Arrangements: Darren Costin and Jerry Hey
- Soprano and Alto Saxophone Solos: Phil Kenzie
- Producer: Richard James Burgess (for the Burgess World Co.)
- Additional Producer: Brian Malouf
- Engineer: Frank Roszak
- Production/Recording Coordinator: Janice Crotch
- Mastering by Steve Marcussen at Precision Lacquer
- Mixed by Brian Malouf
- Manager: David Massey
- Assistant Manager: Christina Rivett at Domino Directions Ltd., London
- Art Director: Ria Lewerke
- Designer: Pietro Alfieri
- Photographer: John Swanell
- Thanks to Stephen Daniel, Patti Felker, Ken Kraus, Lionel Martin, Rosemary Reid, Paul Rodwell, Galaxy, Larrabee & Can-Am Studios, Margaret, Ronny, Kathy, and Randy, Simon Low, Peter Robinson, Korda Marshall, Jeff O'Neil, and Rick O'Neil from RCA, and Zildjian Cymbals.
  - Special Thanks to Paul Atkinson, Nick Feldman, Rob Kahane, Brian Malouf, David Massey, Peter Reichardt, Christina Rivett, Aureen, and all at Warners Publishing.

== Singles ==
- "Driftaway" (US 7" single Double A-side) (1987)
1. "Something in the Air" (7 inch) – 4:39
- "Driftaway" (US 12" single) (1987)
1. "Driftaway" (Extended Dance Mix) – 6:39
2. "Driftaway" (Dub Mix) – 5:02
3. "Dreams for Lovers" (LP) – 4:09
