= Avalon (Lovebugs song) =

Single by Lovebugs feat. Lene Marlin

from the album In Every Waking Moment
- Released: 2006
- Recorded: 2006
- Genre: Pop rock
- Length: 3:28

Lovebugs feat. Lene Marlin singles chronology
"The Key" (2006)	"Avalon" (2006)	"Listen to the Silence" (2006)

"Avalon" is a song by Swiss rock band Lovebugs. The song features guest vocals from Norwegian singer Lene Marlin. "Avalon" is included on Lovebugs' 2006 album, In Every Waking Moment. The song was released as a single, charting at number 10 in Switzerland and number 13 in Norway.
