= Unforgivable Sinner =

1998 single by Lene Marlin

- One of the Norwegian CD single artwork variants

Single by Lene Marlin

from the album Playing My Game
- B-side: "Maybe I'll Go"
- Released: 12 October 1998
- Length: 3:59
- Label: Virgin
- Songwriter: Lene Marlin
- Producers: Hans G; Jørn Dahl

Lene Marlin singles chronology
"Unforgivable Sinner" (1998)	"Sitting Down Here" (1999)

Music video
- "Unforgivable Sinner" on YouTube

Alternative cover
- Standard European artwork

"Unforgivable Sinner" is a song written and performed by Norwegian singer-songwriter Lene Marlin, released as her debut single on 12 October 1998 from her first album, Playing My Game (1999). The song reached number one in Norway and number two in Italy, commencing a successful period of hits for Marlin in both countries. In Norway, it was certified platinum and was the first song by a debut act to enter the VG-lista chart at number one. The song also reached the top 10 in Sweden and the top 20 in the United Kingdom. Three different music videos were made for the song.

== Critical reception ==
Birmingham Evening Mail called the song a "mature" debut, describing it as the "sort of mid-tempo, intense material somebody like Natalie Imbruglia would release." Håkon Moslet from Norwegian newspaper Dagbladet said in his review of Playing My Game, that "Unforgivable Sinner" is a "clear highlight" of the album. He added that "with its slightly dark and disconcerting atmosphere and a refrain you never seem to get bored with, it is one of a kind." Geir Rakvaag from Dagsavisen noted that the song, with "Sitting Down Here" and "Where I'm Headed" are the "most earcatching" songs of the album. Terje Carlsen from Fredrikstad Blad called it "immaculate".

Pia M. Isaksen from Moss Dagblad was less enthustiastic, noting it as "traditional folk", adding that the melody is "nice". New Straits Times called it an "outstanding" tune "set to a pop-hiphop beat with a strong arrangement powered by acoustic guitars". Kjell Nordeng from Nordlands Framtid noted the song with "Sitting Down Here" as "cream of the crop" of the album. Rune Slyngstad from Nordlandsposten gave it 4 out of 6, noting it as a "fresh, nice and sauntering pop-song". Lasse Jangås from Nordlys described it as "wonderful". Pop Rescue wrote, "This one definitely fits in with the likes of [Natalie] Imbruglia’s hit Torn. It has plenty of acoustic strumming, but also plenty of ‘go’ in it too. It's up-beat, catchy, and deserved to be a bigger hit than it was." Linda Nilsen from Tromsø gave the song 6 out of 6, noting that it is "simply something of the best I have ever heard from a Norwegian artist."

== Music videos ==
The first video for "Unforgivable Sinner" was filmed in Norway on 10 July 1998. It features Marlin performing with her guitar at a subway station in Oslo. She also performs while walking in a dark tunnel. Some small scenes in between show her dressed like an angel. Clips from the movie Schpaa are shown through the video. At the end, Marlin as an angel sits atop of a high building looking out over the city.

The second and international version of the video was directed by Stephen Scott and shot at a train station in Toronto, Canada. It has a blue tone and shows Marlin performing inside the station building. A story of a man that is haunted by memories from his childhood is being told in the video. Now grown-up, he keeps seeing the face of a young girl he once knew as a kid. Something happened to her, and he feels guilty. He "sees" her among the crowd of passing people at the station, but then she is gone. In the end the man and Marlin, standing next to each other, are watching the board with train timetables. Then the words "Take Hold Now -- The Future Will Not Remember -- The Past Does Not Forget" suddenly appear on the board.

The third version was directed by Jamie Morgan and features a darkhaired Marlin performing in New York City. In some scenes, she performs in a car that is driving through the city. Other scenes show her at a camping site, where a group of young people are staying, by a caravan. Occasionally a girl wearing wings appears at different sites in the city. The day turns into night and then again to day. The video ends with Marlin strumming on her guitar in the driving car.

== Track listings ==
CD single, Norway (1998)
No.	Title	Length
1.	"Unforgivable Sinner"	4:02
2.	"Maybe I'll Go"	4:37

CD single, Europe (1998)
No.	Title	Length
1.	"Unforgivable Sinner"	3:59
2.	"Maybe I'll Go"	4:33

CD-maxi, Europe (1998)
No.	Title	Length
1.	"Unforgivable Sinner"	4:02
2.	"Maybe I'll Go"	4:37
3.	"The Way We Are" (acoustic)	4:50

CD maxi, Japan (1999)
No.	Title	Length
1.	"Unforgivable Sinner"
2.	"Maybe I'll Go"
3.	"I Know"

CD single (CD1), UK (2000)
No.	Title	Length
1.	"Unforgivable Sinner"
2.	"Unforgivable Sinner" (Tin Tin Out mix)
3.	"Maybe I'll Go"
4.	"Unforgivable Sinner" (video)

CD single (CD2), UK (2000)
No.	Title	Length
1.	"Unforgivable Sinner"
2.	"Unforgivable Sinner" (Disclab Dodgers Doorstep mix)
3.	"The Way We Are" (live at the Sound Republic)
4.	"Unforgivable Sinner" (original video)

== Charts ==
=== Weekly charts ===
Weekly chart performance for "Unforgivable Sinner"
Chart (1998–2000)	Peak position
Australia (ARIA)	48
Europe (Eurochart Hot 100)	77
France (SNEP)	37
Germany (GfK)	78
Italy (FIMI)	1
Italy (Musica e dischi)	2
New Zealand (Recorded Music NZ)	32
Norway (VG-lista)	1
Scotland Singles (OCC)	15
Sweden (Sverigetopplistan)	4
UK Singles (OCC)	13

=== Year-end charts ===
Year-end chart performance for "Unforgivable Sinner"
Chart (1999)	Position
Europe Border Breakers (Music & Media) Norwegian release	41
Europe Border Breakers (Music & Media) Swedish release	34
Italy (Musica e dischi)	5
Romania (Romanian Top 100)	99
Sweden (Hitlistan)	36

== Certifications ==
Certifications and sales for "Unforgivable Sinner"
Region	Certification	Certified units/sales
Norway (IFPI Norway)	Platinum	
Sweden (GLF)	Gold	15,000^{^}
^{^} Shipments figures based on certification alone.

== Release history ==
Release dates and formats for "Unforgivable Sinner"
Region	Date	Format	Label	Ref.
Norway	15 August 1998	Radio	Virgin	
Norway	12 October 1998	CD	Virgin	
Japan	17 February 1999	CD	Virgin	
United Kingdom	4 September 2000	CD	Virgin	
