= Where I'm Headed =

1999 single by Lene Marlin

Single by Lene Marlin

from the album Playing My Game
- B-side: "The Way We Are" (live); "So I See"
- Released: 1999
- Length: 4:11
- Label: Virgin
- Songwriter: Lene Marlin
- Producers: Hans G; Jørn Dahl

Lene Marlin singles chronology
"Sitting Down Here" (1999)	"Where I'm Headed" (1999)	"You Weren't There" (2003)

Music video
- "Where I'm Headed" on YouTube

"Where I'm Headed" is the eight track on Norwegian singer-songwriter Lene Marlin's debut studio album, Playing My Game (1999). Written by Marlin and produced by Hans G and Jørn Dahl, the song was released as the album's third single in late 1999 following Marlin's international breakthrough hit, "Sitting Down Here".

Despite not charting in Marlin's native Norway, the single became a top-10 success in Finland, France, and Italy, peaking at numbers seven, five, and two, respectively. In France, it became Marlin's highest-charting single, earned a gold sales certification, and was ranked number 38 on the Syndicat National de l'Édition Phonographique (SNEP) year-end chart for 1999, selling 300,000 copies there by January 2000. When released in the United Kingdom in 2001, it peaked at number 31 on the UK Singles Chart.

== Composition ==
With a duration of four minutes and eleven seconds, "Where I'm Headed" is composed in the key of D major with a tempo of 120 beats per minute.

== Critical reception ==
Geir Rakvaag from Norwegian newspaper Dagsavisen called "Where I'm Headed", along with "Unforgivable Sinner" and "Sitting Down Here", one of the "catchiest" songs on the album.

== Track listings ==
Norwegian maxi-CD single

1. "Where I'm Headed" – 4:13
2. "Where I'm Headed" (instrumental) – 4:13
3. "The Way We Are" (live at Sound Republic) – 4:49

European CD single

1. "Where I'm Headed" – 4:13
2. "Where I'm Headed" (instrumental) – 4:13

UK CD and cassette single

1. "Where I'm Headed" (Phil Bodger remix edit) – 3:42
2. "Where I'm Headed" – 4:11
3. "So I See" – 4:49

== Charts ==
=== Weekly charts ===
Weekly chart performance for "Where I'm Headed"
Chart (1999–2001)	Peak position
Belgium (Ultratip Bubbling Under Flanders)	7
Belgium (Ultratop 50 Wallonia)	27
Europe (Eurochart Hot 100)	25
Finland (Suomen virallinen lista)	7
France (SNEP)	5
Italy (FIMI)	2
Scotland Singles (OCC)	28
Sweden (Sverigetopplistan)	35
Switzerland (Schweizer Hitparade)	28
UK Singles (OCC)	31

=== Year-end charts ===
Year-end chart performance for "Where I'm Headed"
Chart (1999)	Position
Europe Border Breakers (Music & Media)	54
France (SNEP)	38

== Certifications ==
Certifications and sales for "Where I'm Headed"
Region	Certification	Certified units/sales
France (SNEP)	Gold	300,000

== Release history ==
Release dates and formats for "Where I'm Headed"
Region	Date	Format(s)	Label(s)	Ref.
Norway	1999	Maxi-CD	Virgin	
France	3 October 1999	CD	Virgin	
United Kingdom	1 January 2001	CD; cassette	Virgin	
