= Mickelson-Chapman Fountain =

Fountain and sculpture in Ashland, Oregon, U.S.

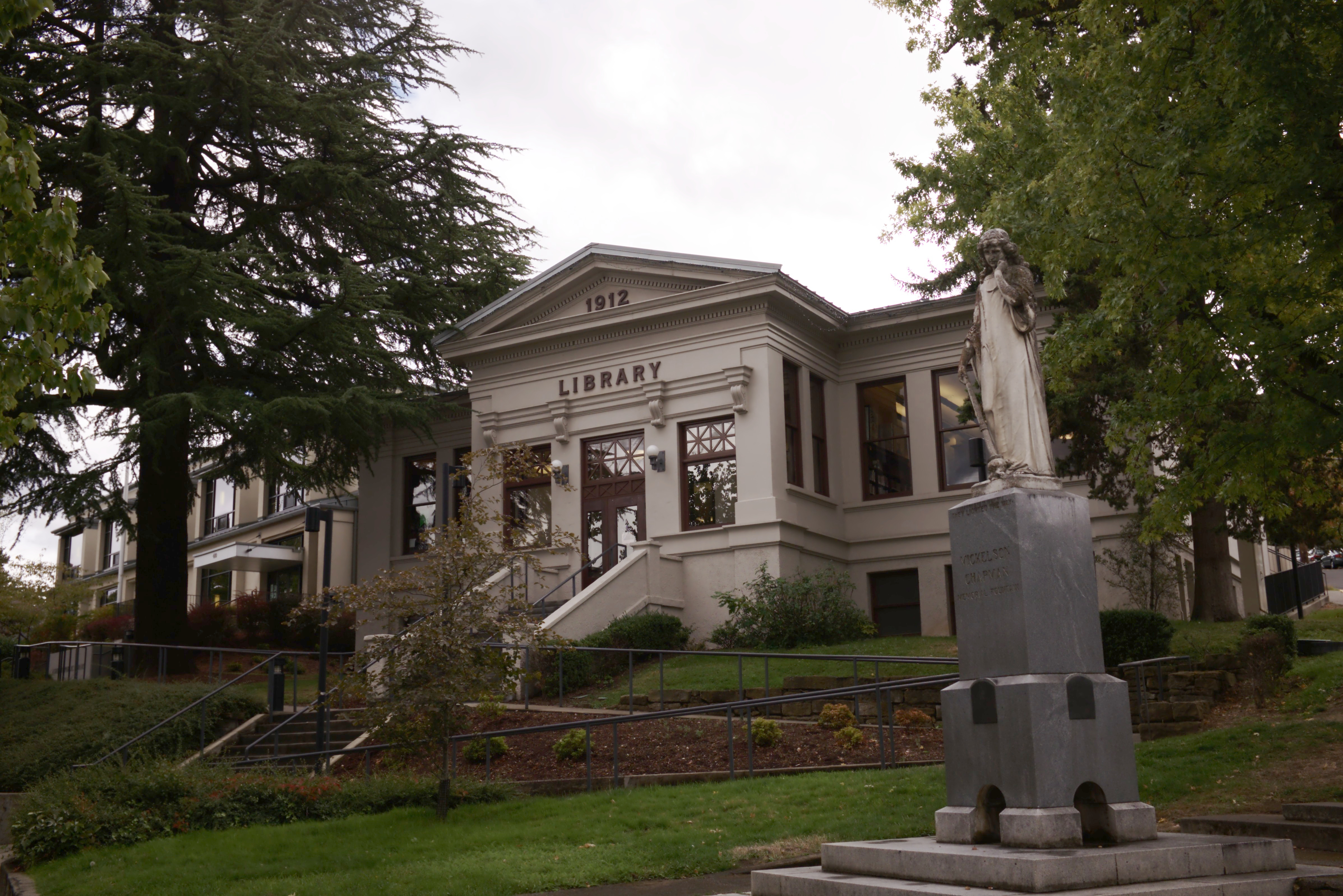
- The statue in front of the library in 2016
- Location: Ashland, Oregon, U.S.
- 42.194382°N 122.710061°W

The Mickelson-Chapman Fountain is a monument and sculpture installed in front of Ashland, Oregon's Carnegie Library, in the United States.

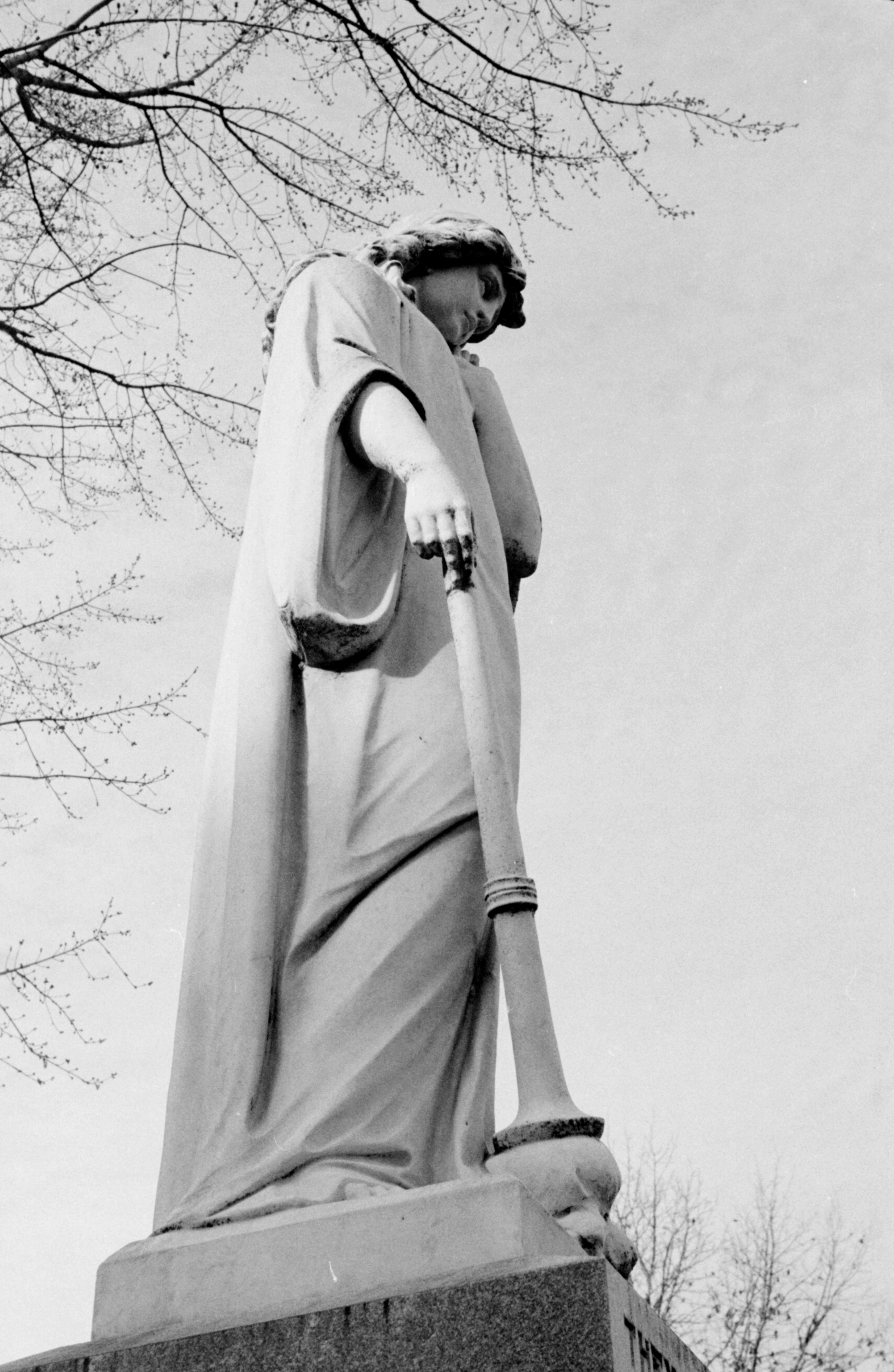
Mickelson-Chapman Fountain: View from east
