= In Every Waking Moment =

Studio album by Lovebugs
- Released: 2006
- Genre: Pop rock
- Length: 45:47

Lovebugs chronology
Naked (2005)	In Every Waking Moment (2006)	The Highest Heights (2009)

In Every Waking Moment is a platinum-awarded album by Swiss band Lovebugs, released in 2006. The album includes the hit tracks "Avalon" (featuring Lene Marlin), "The Key", and "Back to Life". The album reached the highest position on the Swiss charts.

== Track listing ==
1. "Tonight" – 4:19
2. "The Key" – 4:12
3. "Back to Life" – 3:30
4. "A Wonderful Thing" – 4:53
5. "Avalon" featuring Lene Marlin – 3:28
6. "Wide Awake" – 3:54
7. "Listen to the Silence" – 3:12
8. "Not Alone" – 4:56
9. "Broken Smile" – 3:21
10. "Weather in Me" – 3:22
11. "Borrowed Tune" (Neil Young) – 6:43

== Charts ==
=== Weekly charts ===
Chart (2006)	Peak position
Swiss Albums (Schweizer Hitparade)	1

=== Year-end charts ===
Chart (2006)	Position
Swiss Albums (Schweizer Hitparade)	31
