= Lene Marlin =

Norwegian musician (b. 1980)

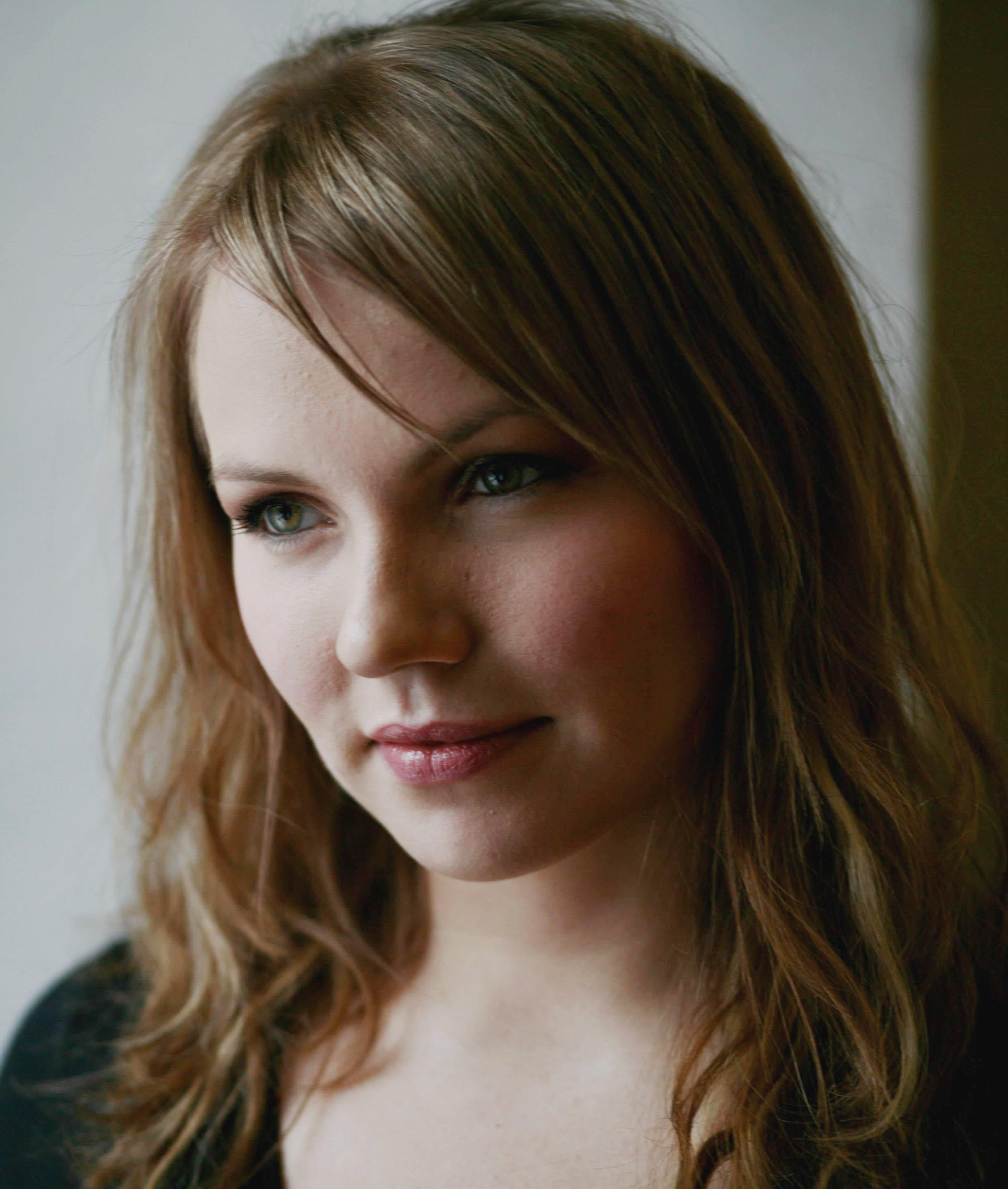
- Marlin in 2009
- Born: Lene Marlin Pedersen; 17 August 1980 (age 46); Tromsø, Norway
- Occupations: Musician; singer; songwriter
- Years active: 1998–2009, 2012, 2014
- Partner: Kåre Conradi
- Children: 1
- Musical career
- Genres: Pop; acoustic; country
- Instruments: Vocals; piano; guitar
- Labels: Virgin; EMI

Lene Marlin Pedersen (born 17 August 1980) is a Norwegian former musician, singer and songwriter.

== Career ==
=== Playing My Game (1998–2002) ===
Marlin made her Norwegian recording debut on 12 October 1998, with the single "Unforgivable Sinner", a number one hit for eight weeks. It was the fastest selling single in Norwegian music history and appeared in the soundtrack of the Norwegian movie Schpaaa. Her first album, Playing My Game, followed. She won an MTV Europe award in 1999. Her single "Where I'm Headed", from the French film, Mauvaises fréquentations, became a top 5 hit in France and Italy. Her song "Sitting Down Here" became a top 5 hit in the UK Singles Chart and reached number 5 in the Netherlands in 2000.

=== Another Day (2003–2004) ===
Marlin's second album, Another Day, was released on 22 September 2003. Two singles were released: "You Weren't There" and "Another Day". "You Weren't There" debuted at No. 1 on Norway Singles Top 20 and remained on the chart for 11 weeks. It also stayed for 24 weeks in Italy Singles Top 50 chart, peaking at No. 1. "You Weren't There" was less successful in the UK, reaching #59. The single "Another Day" was released in Italy and Norway only, and peaked at No. 17 on the Italian Singles chart. "Sorry" was released only in Italy.

=== Lost in a Moment (2005–2007) ===
In June 2005, Marlin released her third album, Lost in a Moment. The first single from that album, "How Would It Be", was released in Europe in May 2005, and made the Top 20 in both Norway and Italy Singles chart. This single also appeared briefly for a week at a low spot in Germany Singles Top 100. The second single was "What If", released only in Italy.

Marlin made a trip to Taiwan and China during October 2005 to promote a Taiwanese version of Lost in a Moment. This included one bonus track, "Still Here", a cover of a song by Chinese singer, Faye Wong. Events held included a concert appearance hosted by MTV Taiwan, various television appearances, and a live street gig. Her record company claims that Lost in a Moment was their best selling western record of the year.

=== Twist the Truth (2008–present) ===
In July 2008, Marlin was in the studio recording her fourth album with Norwegian artists and songwriters Even "Magnet" Johansen and Børge Fjordheim at Askøy, Grand Sports and Malabar Studios.

Twist the Truth, her fourth album, was released on 30 March 2009.

The album has ten tracks. The first single, "Here We Are", was number one on the Norwegian National Radio Chart for two weeks, and was the most airplayed Norwegian song of 2009.

=== Other work ===
Marlin has written songs for other artists, including Rihanna's "Good Girl Gone Bad" and "Whole New Beginning" and "Picking Up The Pieces" for Elin Gaustad. She also co-wrote "Yesterday's Gone" with Frida Amundsen, which was featured on Amundsen's 2012 debut album, September Blue.

In 2006, she performed with Swiss band, Lovebugs on their single "Avalon", which made the Top 10 in the Swiss chart as well as topping the Swiss National Airplay Chart.

In 2009, Marlin was featured on Aleksander Denstad With's single "Worth It" which peaked at No. 3 on Norway Single Chart and earned a Gold Record for single sales in Norway.

In 2011, she worked with Gary Louris, Autumn Rowe, Mads Langer, and Tobias Stenkjaer.

In 2013, Marlin participated in the reality show Hver gang vi møtes on TV2. She also wrote Omfavnelsen for the Ole Paus' album "Avslutningen".

In September 2014, Marlin wrote an essay for Norway's largest newspaper, Aftenposten, in which she candidly described her lifelong struggles with depression and a suicide attempt due to the pressures of work and fame.

== Personal life ==
In June 2020, Marlin announced her pregnancy on Instagram with her partner, Kåre Conradi. Their daughter was born in October 2020.

== Awards ==
Award	Year	Nominee(s)	Category	Result	Ref.
NRJ Music Awards	2001	Herself	International Breakthrough of the Year	Nominated	

Marlin has won four awards: Best Pop Solo Artist, Best Single ("Sitting Down Here"), Best Newcomer and the 1999 Artist Of The Year at the Spellemannprisen, the Norwegian equivalent to the Grammy awards, as well as the MTV Europe award for Best Nordic Act, presented in Dublin, Ireland in November 1999.

Marlin was also nominated for Best International Breakthrough Act at the 2001 BRIT Awards, alongside P!nk, Jill Scott, Westlife and Kelis, losing to Kelis.

== Discography ==
- Playing My Game (1999)
- Another Day (2003)
- Lost in a Moment (2005)
- Twist the Truth (2009)

Awards
Preceded by Bertine Zetlitz	Recipient of the best Pop Solo Artist Spellemannprisen; 1999	Succeeded by Bertine Zetlitz
Preceded by Vidar Busk	Recipient of the Artist of the year Spellemannprisen; 1999	Succeeded by Briskeby
Preceded by Bertine Zetlitz	Recipient of the Newcomer of the year Spellemannprisen; 1999	Succeeded by Briskeby
Preceded by No open class	Recipient of the Open class Gammleng-prisen; 2007	Succeeded by Anneli Drecker
