= Here We Are (short story) =

Short story by Dorothy Parker (1931)

"Here We Are" is a short story by American writer Dorothy Parker, first published in Cosmopolitan Magazine on March 31, 1931. The story, written almost entirely as dialogue, describes a tense scene between a newly married couple traveling by train to New York City for the first night of their honeymoon.

== Synopsis ==
An unnamed young couple is traveling in a train car. The dialogue reveals that they have been married for "two hours and twenty-six minutes." During the scene, they discuss the wedding, the bridesmaids' dresses, the bride's new hat, what to do at their destination, and other apparently trivial topics. They briefly fall into a petty argument about whether their marriage was a good decision. By the end, they make up and pledge to avoid fighting during the marriage.

However, none of what is said is the actual topic of conversation. The two characters are actually attempting to talk about sex—specifically, the fact that they are expected to consummate the marriage that night. It is implied that they have never previously discussed this or experienced any degree of physical intimacy. Neither is willing to explicitly broach the topic; each appears to hope that the other is making the same assumptions about what is to take place.

The petty conflicts that erupt during the conversation represent each character's fear that their new spouse does not have the same assumptions about what is expected of them and that the new partner does not love them in the way they want to be loved. The wife in particular is concerned about her powerlessness in the marital arrangement, mentioning several times that she is "alone" on a train with the husband, away from her family. Although the characters appear to have come to an unspoken consensus by the end, the author makes heavy use of irony to imply that this is only the first of many failures to communicate.

== Anthologies and adaptations ==
"Here We Are" has been anthologized in a number of Parker short story collections, including After Such Pleasures and The Portable Dorothy Parker. It has also been adapted into a one-act play.
