= Carter Memorial Fountain =

Sculpture in Ashland, Oregon, U.S.

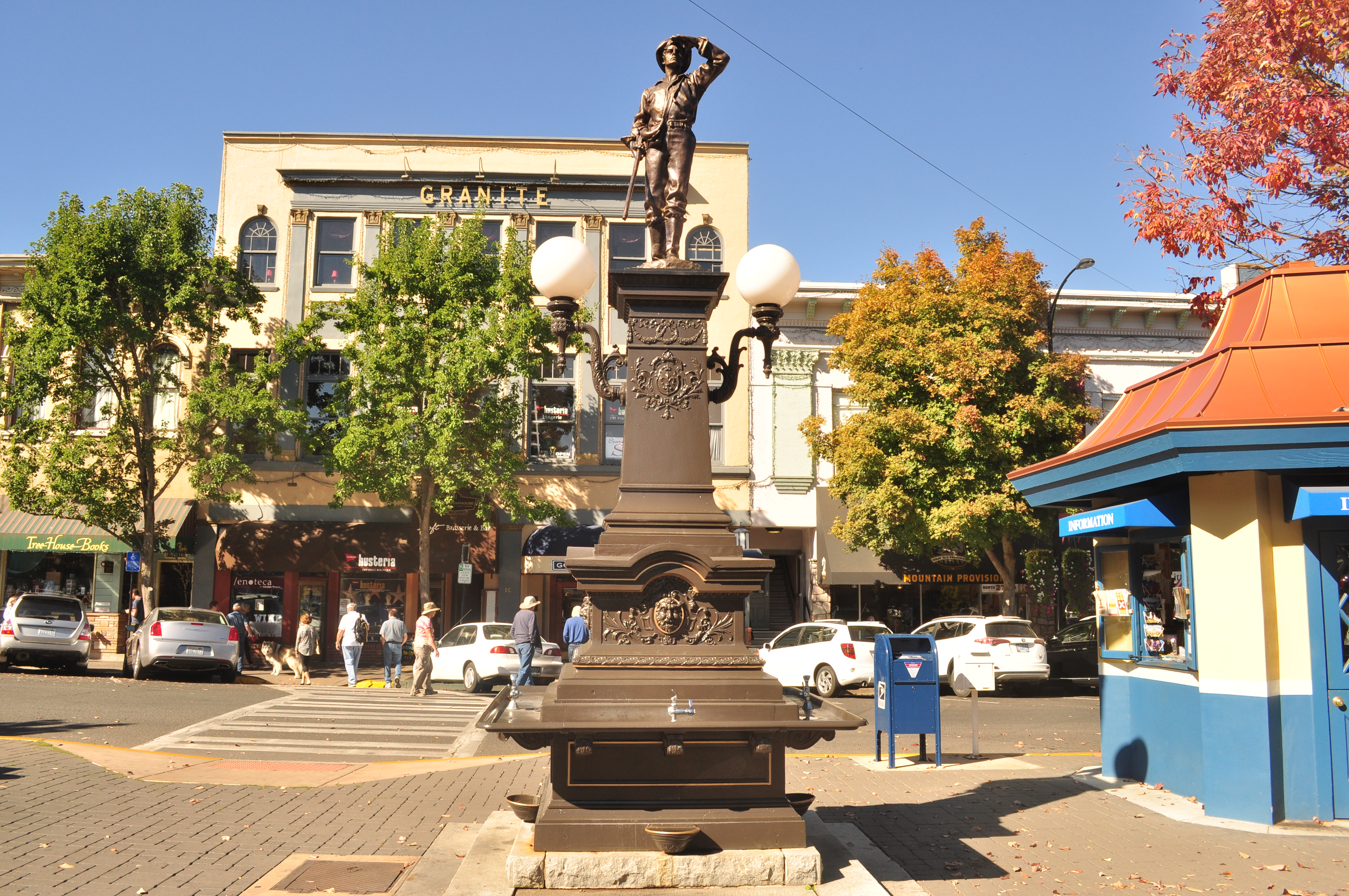
- The fountain in 2016
- Location in Ashland
- Location: Ashland, Oregon, United States
- 42.197127°N 122.715409°W

Carter Memorial Fountain is a fountain in Ashland, Oregon, United States. It features Pioneer Mike (or "Iron Mike"), a statue by Allen George Newman. The fountain and statue are part of the Ashland Downtown Historic District, which is listed on the National Register of Historic Places.
