= Here We Are (one-act play) =

Here We Are is a one-act play adapted from a short story of the same name by Dorothy Parker. Set in the early 1930s in a Pullman car on a train to New York City, it explores through dialogue the already-testy relationship between a newly married young man and young woman setting out on their honeymoon.

As the play is relatively short, employs only one location and two actors, it is commonly used in high school and college one-act play performances in the United States.
