= Street Scene (Young) =

Sculpture in Ashland, Oregon, U.S.

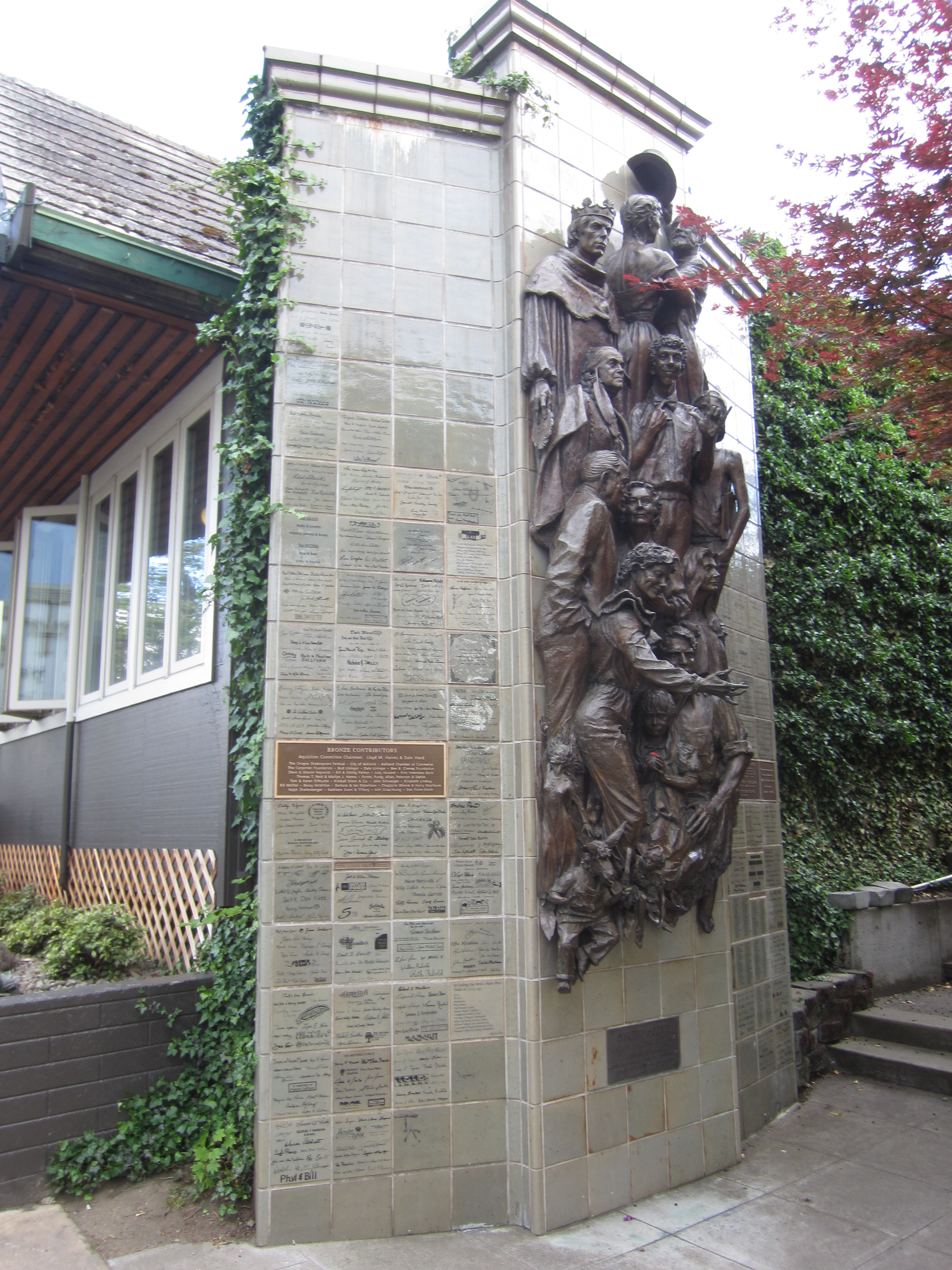
- The sculpture in 2019
- Location: Ashland, Oregon, United States
- 42.19645°N 122.71374°W

Street Scene is a bas-relief sculpture by Marion L. Young installed outside the Chamber of Commerce in Ashland, Oregon, United States. It depicts more than a dozen Shakespearean characters. The artwork was funded by the city's 1988 Downtown Plan, which recommended the installation of fountains and public art in select Ashland locations. Pat Corrigan of the St. Louis Post-Dispatch described the sculpture as "compelling".
