= Antonio Frilli =

Italian sculptor

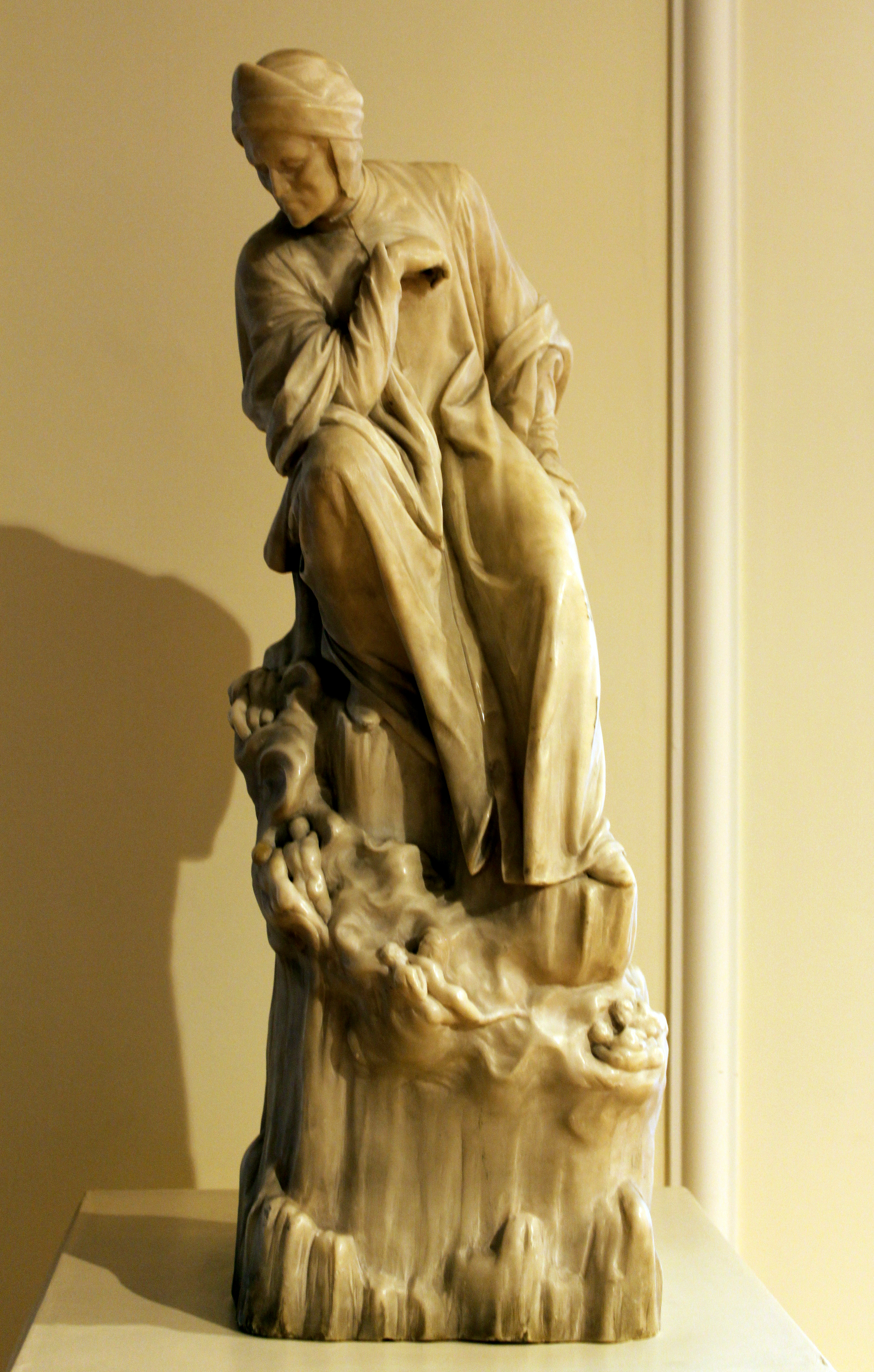
Antonio Frilli - Dante, National Art Museum of Azerbaijan.

Antonio Frilli (born 1860 and died 22 July 1892) was a Florentine sculptor who specialized in marble and alabaster statues for public and private customers.

== Work ==
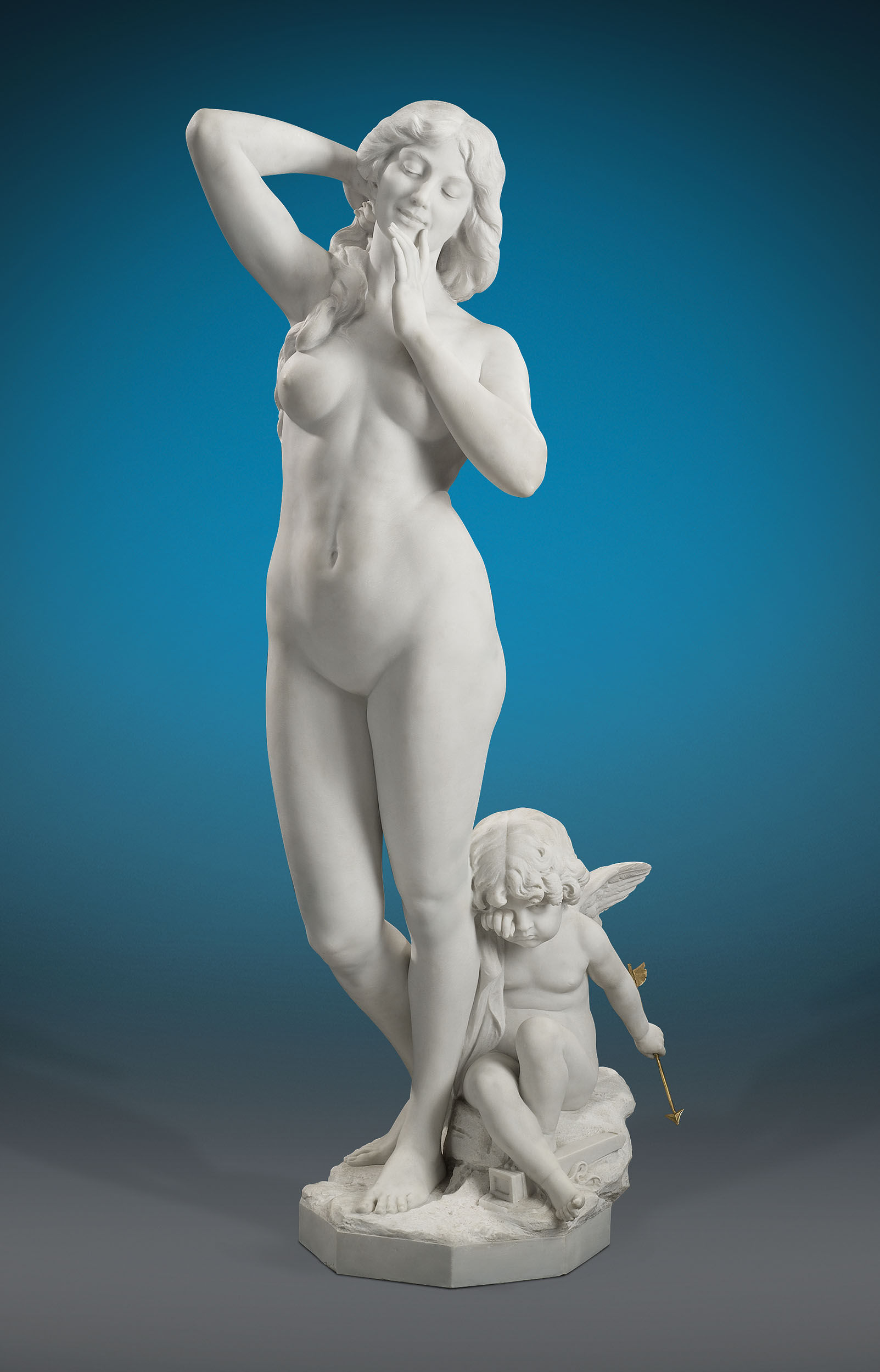
Venus and Cupid by Antonio Frilli. Marble, late 19th century

In 1883, Frilli established his first and exclusive Atelier in via dei Fossi, Florence, where he worked with a few assistants on medium-size refined painted alabasters and large white Carrara marble statues for private villas and monumental cemeteries. His works decorate famous cemeteries such as Porte Sante and Allori in Florence. A marble portrait of Frilli was carved in his Atelier after his death, and it was placed on his family tomb in Cimitero degli Allori.

Frilli and his gallery were well known in Europe, the United States and Australia, as he took part in several world's fair exhibitions. He was in Philadelphia for the Centennial Exposition of 1876, and in 1881 his statues and garden furnitures were exhibited in the Italian Pavilion in Melbourne, Australia.

In 1904, two years after Frilli's death, his son Umberto took part in the Louisiana Purchase Exposition in St. Louis, Missouri, where one of his father's works – a sculpture on a "Woman on a Hammock" in white Carrara marble – won the Grand Prize and 6 gold medals. In 1999, the same masterpiece was sold by Sotheby's with an auction estimate of $800,000.

More recently, Frilli's 1892 sculpture "Sweet Dreams", which features a life-sized reclining nude in a hammock and which was exhibited at Panama–Pacific International Exposition in San Francisco in 1915, was sold at a Los Angeles auction house. A 2013 novel by Gary Rinehart, Nude Sleeping in a Hammock, is a fictionalized account of the statue's owners since 1892 and how the sculpture affected their fortunes.

== See also ==
- Italian art
