= Sitting Down Here =

1999 single by Lene Marlin

- Norwegian, European, and Australian artwork

Single by Lene Marlin

from the album Playing My Game
- Released: 22 February 1999
- Studio: Disclab (Oslo, Norway)
- Length: 3:55
- Label: Virgin
- Songwriter: Lene Marlin
- Producers: Hans G; Jorn Dahl

Lene Marlin singles chronology
| "Unforgivable Sinner" (1998) | "Sitting Down Here" (1999) | "Where I'm Headed" (1999) |

Music video
- "Sitting Down Here" on YouTube

Alternative cover
- UK and French artwork

"Sitting Down Here" is a song written by Norwegian singer-songwriter Lene Marlin for her 1999 debut album, Playing My Game. The song is the album's opening track and was released as its second single in February 1999, peaking at number two on the Norwegian Singles Chart. It also peaked within the top 10 in Finland, Hungary, Italy, the Netherlands, New Zealand, and the United Kingdom.

== Release and composition ==
The single reached number two in Norway, number three in Italy, number four in Finland, New Zealand and Scotland, and number five in the Netherlands and the UK. The song also peaked at number six in Hungary and Ireland, number 12 in Denmark, and number 18 in Sweden. "Sitting Down Here" is composed in common time and has the standard verse-chorus form. Its instrumentation comes mainly from the guitar.

== Critical reception ==
Can't Stop the Pop stated that Marlin's "ability to craft a track with so many layers and shades of grey was impressive and Sitting Down Here was the perfect showcase of that, at the very least." Håkon Moslet from Norwegian newspaper Dagbladet noted the song as "smooth [and] radio-friendly" in his review of Playing My Game. Geir Rakvaag from Dagsavisen wrote that the song, with "Unforgivable Sinner" and "Where I'm Headed" are the "most earcatching" songs of the album. Terje Carlsen from Fredrikstad Blad said it is "immaculate".

Pia M. Isaksen from Moss Dagblad was less enthustiastic, calling it "traditional folk" with a "nice" melody. Kjell Nordeng from Nordlands Framtid wrote in his review, that "Sitting Down Here" and "Unforgivable Sinner" are the "cream of the crop" of the album. Pop Rescue noted the song as a "gentle acoustic guitar meandering", adding that "this song is catchy, it feels summery and light. The guitars are delicate, and the bass line gently prods it along."

== Track listings ==
- Norwegian CD single (1999)
1. "Sitting Down Here" – 3:55
2. "The Way We Are" (live acoustic version) – 4:50
- European CD single (1999)
1. "Sitting Down Here" – 3:55
2. "Playing My Game (acoustic version) – 3:27
- Australian CD single (1999)
1. "Sitting Down Here" – 3:55
2. "Playing My Game (acoustic version) – 3:27
3. "I Know" – 2:23
- UK CD single (2000)
1. "Sitting Down Here" (original version) – 3:55
2. "Sitting Down Here" (Tin Tin Out mix) – 3:53
3. "Playing My Game (acoustic version) – 3:27
4. "Sitting Down Here" (video) – 3:55
- UK cassette single (2000)
1. "Sitting Down Here" (original version)
2. "Sitting Down Here" (Tin Tin Out mix)
3. "Playing My Game" (acoustic version)

== Personnel ==
- Lead vocals: Lene Marlin
- Producers: Hans G, Jorn Dahl
- Audio mixing: Richard Lowe
- Guitar: Bernt Rune Stray
- Drums, programming: Jorn Dahl
- Audio mixing assistant: Dab Bierton

== Charts ==
=== Weekly charts ===
Weekly chart performance for "Sitting Down Here"
| Chart (1999–2000) | Peak position |
|---|---|
| Australia (ARIA) | 54 |
| Austria (Ö3 Austria Top 40) | 38 |
| Belgium (Ultratop 50 Flanders) | 44 |
| Belgium (Ultratop 50 Wallonia) | 31 |
| Denmark (IFPI) | 12 |
| Europe (Eurochart Hot 100) | 23 |
| Finland (Suomen virallinen lista) | 4 |
| France (SNEP) | 48 |
| Germany (GfK) | 57 |
| Hungary (Mahasz) | 6 |
| Iceland (Íslenski Listinn Topp 40) | 29 |
| Ireland (IRMA) | 6 |
| Italy (FIMI) | 5 |
| Italy Airplay (Music & Media) | 2 |
| Netherlands (Dutch Top 40) | 5 |
| Netherlands (Single Top 100) | 7 |
| New Zealand (Recorded Music NZ) | 4 |
| Norway (VG-lista) | 2 |
| Scottish Singles Sales (Official Charts) | 4 |
| Sweden (Sverigetopplistan) | 18 |
| UK Singles (Official Charts) | 5 |

=== Year-end charts ===
1999 year-end chart performance for "Sitting Down Here"
| Chart (1999) | Position |
|---|---|
| European Radio Top 50 (Music & Media) | 62 |
| Europe Border Breakers (Music & Media) | 6 |
| Italy (Musica e dischi) | 20 |

2000 year-end chart performance for "Sitting Down Here"
| Chart (2000) | Position |
|---|---|
| Ireland (IRMA) | 70 |
| Italy (Musica e dischi) | 78 |
| Netherlands (Dutch Top 40) | 37 |
| Netherlands (Single Top 100) | 74 |
| New Zealand (RIANZ) | 6 |
| UK Singles (OCC) | 49 |

== Certifications ==
Certifications and sales for "Sitting Down Here"
| Region | Certification | Certified units/sales |
|---|---|---|
| Norway (IFPI Norway) | Gold | |
| United Kingdom (BPI) | Gold | 400,000^{‡} |
^{‡} Sales+streaming figures based on certification alone.

== Release history ==
Release dates and formats for "Sitting Down Here"
| Region | Date | Format(s) | Label(s) | Ref(s). |
|---|---|---|---|---|
| Norway | 10 February 1999 | Radio | Virgin | |
| Norway | 22 February 1999 | CD | Virgin | |
| Europe | 28 June 1999 | CD | Virgin | |
| United Kingdom | 28 February 2000 | CD; cassette | Virgin | |
