= We Are Here (sculpture) =

Pair of sculptures in Ashland, Oregon, U.S.

- Location: Ashland, Oregon, United States

We Are Here is the name of two sculptures in Ashland, Oregon, United States.

== Original sculpture ==
The original 19-foot (5.8 m), 3,000-pound wooden sculpture was carved from an alder tree by Russell Beebe to commemorate indigenous peoples of Southern Oregon. It was installed at the intersection of Lithia Way and North Main. The artwork was gifted to the City of Ashland in 2006. Relocation was required to prevent deterioration, and the sculpture was moved to the Hannon Library on the Southern Oregon University campus during the 2010s.

== Replica ==
A bronze replica by Jack Langford was installed on a base by Jesse Biesanz at the site of the original sculpture.
