= Lovebugs (band) =

Swiss rock band

- Origin: Basel, Switzerland
- Genres: Alternative rock
- Years active: 1992–present
- Labels: BMG Ariola (1993–1999); Warner Music (2000–2003); Phonag Records (2006-present)
- Members: Adrian Sieber; Florian Senn; Matthias Gusset; Manuel Meisel; Philipp Gut
- Past members: Sebastian "Baschi" Hausmann; Julie Lagger; Thomas Rechberger; Stefan Wagner; Simon Ramseier
- Website: lovebugs.ch

The Lovebugs are a Swiss rock band from Basel, Switzerland founded in 1992. They have had three number one albums in the Swiss charts.

== History ==
Lovebugs was founded in 1992 by Adrian Sieber, Sebastian "Baschi" Hausmann and Julie Lagger, after Adrian placed an advert in a music shop: Drummer Wanted. They won a local talent contest, which enabled them to record their first album. One year later, the drummer, Julie, left the band and was replaced by Simon Ramseier.

In 1994, their first album, Fluff, was released.

In 1995, they went on their first tour which included shows around Europe. Their second album, Tart, was released the same year.

In 1996, they got their first breakthrough when their single "Fantastic" reached number 40 in the Swiss charts. They signed to BMG Ariola.

In 1998, an additional guitarist, Thomas Riechberger, joined the band.

In 2000, their album Transatlantic Flight reached number 3 in the Swiss album charts. It was their first release under Warner Music label. This was followed by Awaydays, which was the band's first number one album. The single "Music Makes My World Go Round" reached number 6. Bassist Sebastian left the band to dedicate himself to the glam-rock project 'Fucking Beautiful'. He was replaced by Florian Senn. At the same time, Stefan Wagner joined the band on keyboards.

After a short break, in 2003 they released the album 13 Songs With A View which contained the singles "A Love Like Tides" and "'72". The album was not as successful as the two earlier albums and reached number 7 in the Swiss charts. The next album, Naked, was a live and unplugged album. It was their second number one album. It was produced by Chris von Rohr, former member of fellow Swiss band Krokus.

In 2006, their album In Every Waking Moment reached the top of the Swiss charts. It contained The Key and Avalon. The song "Avalon" featured the Norwegian singer Lene Marlin and reached number 10 in the Swiss charts and number 27 in the Norwegian charts.

After 2006, Lovebugs took a break because the singer Adrian Sieber wanted to carry out a solo career under the name Adrian Solo.

In 2009, Lovebugs were chosen to represent Switzerland at the Eurovision Song Contest in Moscow, Russia. They presented the song "The Highest Heights", but did not qualify for the finals. They ended up 14th in the first semi-final held on 12 May 2009, out of 18 contestants.

At the same time, a new album, The Highest Heights, was released. The album reached 2nd place in the Swiss charts. The first single "21st Century Man" reached number 55 in Switzerland. The second single and Eurovision entry, "The Highest Heights", reached 25th in Switzerland and 57th in Sweden.

After a long hiatus, Adrian Sieber announced the return of the band with a new line-up and a new forthcoming album Heartbreak City in 2024.

== Members ==
From 2001 to 2023, the line up consisted of:

- Adrian Sieber (vocals)
- Thomas Riechberger (guitar)
- Florian Senn (bass)
- Stefan Wagner (keyboards, back vocals)
- Simon Ramseier (drums)

== Discography ==
=== Studio albums ===
- 1994: Fluff
- 1995: Tart
- 1996: Lovebugs (CH No. 44)
- 1997: Lovebugs (Remix album)
- 2000: Transatlantic Flight (CH No. 3)
- 2001: Awaydays (CH No. 1)
- 2003: 13 Songs with a View (CH No. 7)
- 2006: In Every Waking Moment (CH No. 1)
- 2009: The Highest Heights (CH No. 2)
- 2012: Life is Today (CH No. 2)
- 2016: Land Ho! (CH No. 9)

=== Live ===
- 1999: Live via satellite - the radio X-Session
- 2005: Naked (Unplugged) (CH No. 1)
- 2018: At the Plaza (CH No. 12)

=== Compilations ===
- 2009: Only Forever: The Best of Lovebugs (CH No. 11)

=== Singles ===
- 1994: "Take Me as I Am"
- 1995: "Slumber"
- 1996: "Starving"
- 1996: "Fantastic"
- 1996: "Marilyn"
- 1996: "Whirlpool"
- 1996: "Fingers and Thumbs"
- 1998: "Angel Heart" (CH 32)
- 1999: "Under My Skin" (CH No. 17)
- 2000: "Bitter Moon" (CH No. 42)
- 2000: "Wall of Sound"
- 2001: "Music Makes My World Go Round" (CH No. 16)
- 2001: "Coffee and Cigarettes" (CH No. 46)
- 2002: "Flavour of the Day" (CH No. 28)
- 2003: "A Love Like Tides" (CH No. 63)
- 2003: "'72"
- 2005: "Everybody Knows I Love You" (Unplugged)
- 2005: "When I See You Smile" (Unplugged)
- 2005: "A Love Like Tides" (Unplugged)
- 2006: "The Key" (CH No. 17)
- 2006: "Avalon" (Featuring Lene Marlin) (CH No. 10), (NO No. 13)
- 2006: "Listen to the Silence"
- 2006: "Back to Life"
- 2009: "21st Century Man" (CH No. 55)
- 2009: "The Highest Heights" (CH No. 25), (SE No. 57)
- 2009: "Shine"
- 2012: "Truth Is"
- 2012: "Little Boy" (featuring Søren Huss)
- 2012: "Jennifer Beals"
- 2012: "Fortuna!"
- 2016: "Land Ho!"

Preceded by Paolo Meneguzzi with "Era stupendo"	Switzerland in the Eurovision Song Contest; 2009	Succeeded by Michael von der Heide with "Il pleut de l'or"
