= Twist the Truth =

Studio album by Lene Marlin
- Released: 30 March 2009
- Recorded: 2008–2009
- Genres: Pop; folk; acoustic
- Length: 41:45
- Label: EMI

Lene Marlin chronology
Lost in a Moment (2005)	Twist the Truth (2009)

Singles from Twist the Truth
- 1. "Here We Are" Released: 13 March 2009

Professional ratings
Review scores
Source	Rating
Sputnikmusic	4/5 stars

Twist the Truth is the fourth album by Norwegian musician Lene Marlin. It was released on 30 March 2009. "Here We Are" was released as the first single from the album.

Marlin began work on the album with Even "Magnet" Johansen in late spring 2008. In July 2008, several Norwegian webpages announced that she was in the studio recording her fourth album.

According to an article in Dagbladet, 16 April 2009, Twist the Truth has sold 17,000 copies since being released. The album was certified gold in Norway and was confirmed by Lene on her official Myspace page.

The first single, "Here We Are", has secured Lene's comeback by remaining on the premier spot on the Norwegian National Radio Chart for two weeks. For the first time since 2003, Lene has a No. 1 hit on the radio in Norway.

== Track listing ==
All tracks are written by Lene Marlin.

No.	Title	Length
1.	"Everything's Good"	3:43
2.	"Come Home"	3:59
3.	"Here We Are"	3:26
4.	"Story of a Life"	3:01
5.	"You Could Have"	3:48
6.	"I'll Follow"	4:07
7.	"Learned from Mistakes"	5:46
8.	"Have I Ever Told You"	4:04
9.	"Do You Remember"	3:26
10.	"You Will Cry No More"	2:43

== Charts ==
Chart (2009)	Peak position
Italian Albums (FIMI)	44
Norwegian Albums (VG-lista)	3
Swedish Albums (Sverigetopplistan)	57
Swiss Albums (Schweizer Hitparade)	67

== Certifications ==
Region	Certification	Certified units/sales
Norway (IFPI Norway)	Gold	15,000
