= Butler-Perozzi Fountain =

Fountain and sculpture in Ashland, Oregon, U.S.

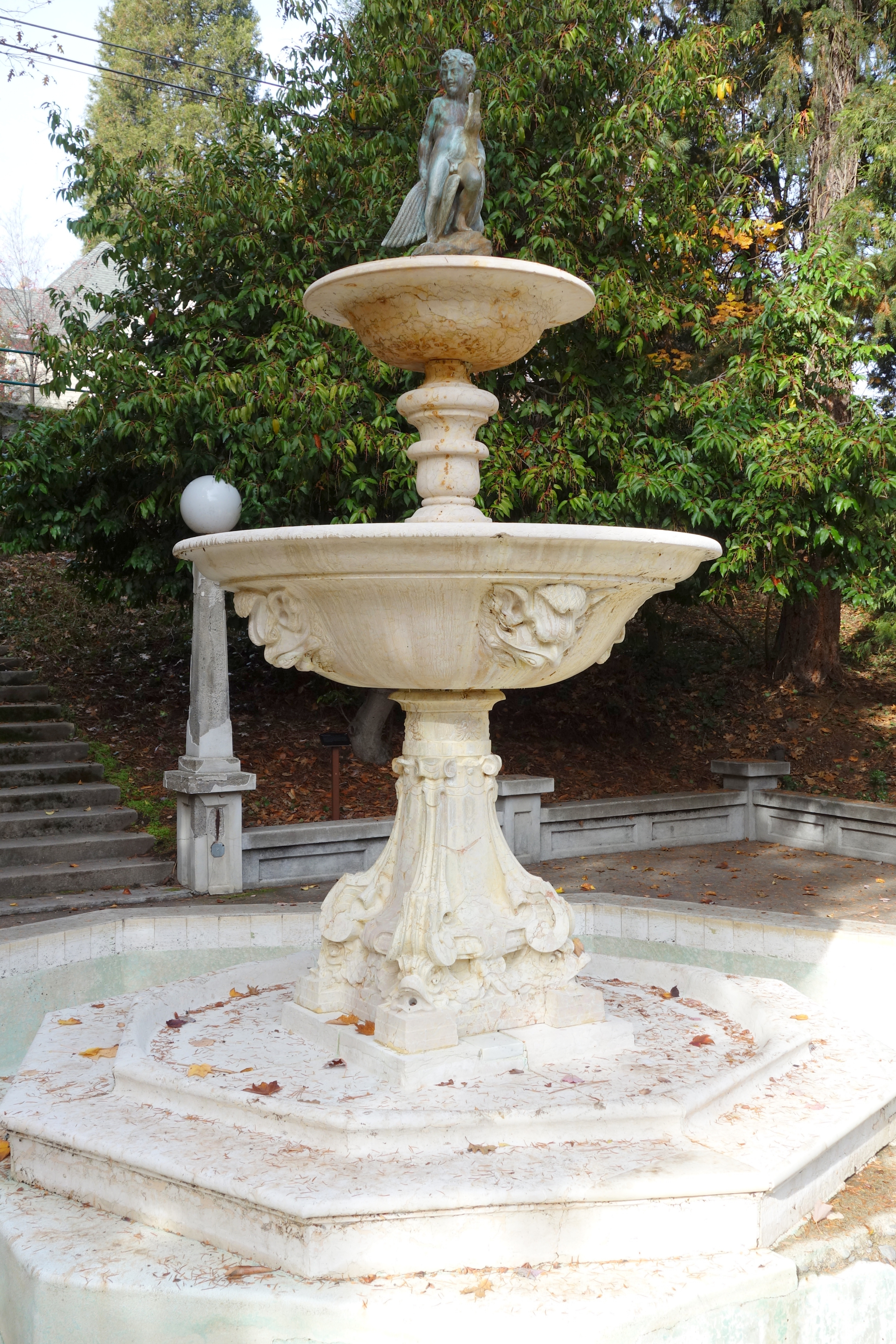
- The fountain in 2013
- Location: Ashland, Oregon, United States
- 42.193567°N 122.7186°W

The Butler-Perozzi Fountain is a fountain in Ashland, Oregon, United States. The fountain was displayed at the Panama–Pacific International Exposition (1915), then purchased and gifted to the City of Ashland by Gwin S. Butler and Domingo Perozzi.
