= Ashland Downtown Historic District =

Historic district in Oregon, United States

- U.S. National Register of Historic Places
- U.S. Historic district
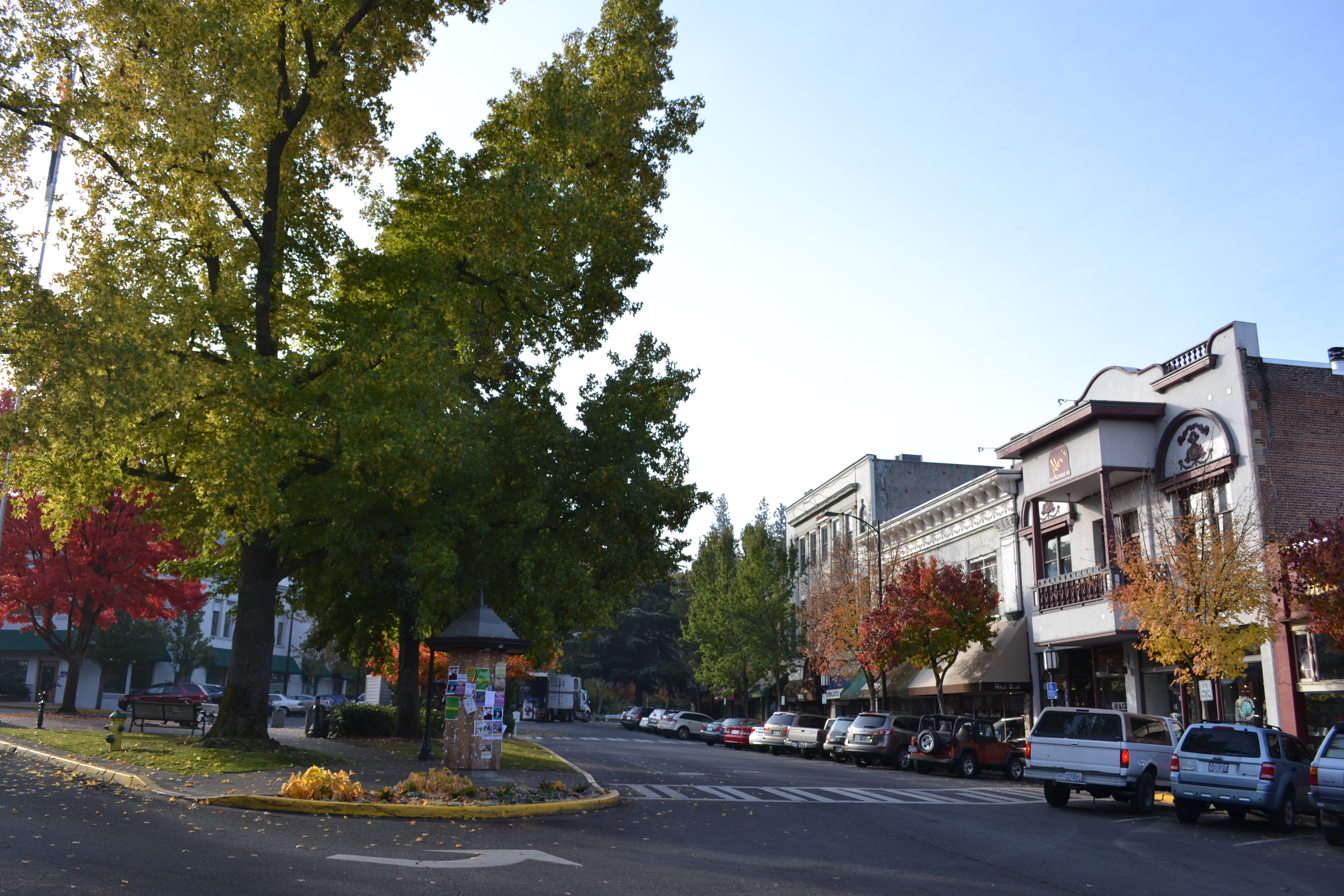
- Some of the district's historic buildings, 2011

- Location within Oregon
- Location: Roughly bounded by Lithia Way/C St., Church, Lithia Park/Hargadine, and Gresham Sts., Ashland, Oregon
- Coordinates: 42.1959°N 122.7124°W
- Area: 32.2 acres (13.0 ha)
- Architectural style: Early Commercial, Moderne, other
- NRHP reference No.: 00000446
- Added to NRHP: May 5, 2000

The Ashland Downtown Historic District in Ashland, Oregon is a 32.2 acres (13.0 ha) historic district (United States) which was listed on the National Register of Historic Places in 2000. The district is roughly bounded by Lithia Way and C Street, Church, Lithia Park and Hargadine and Gresham Streets.

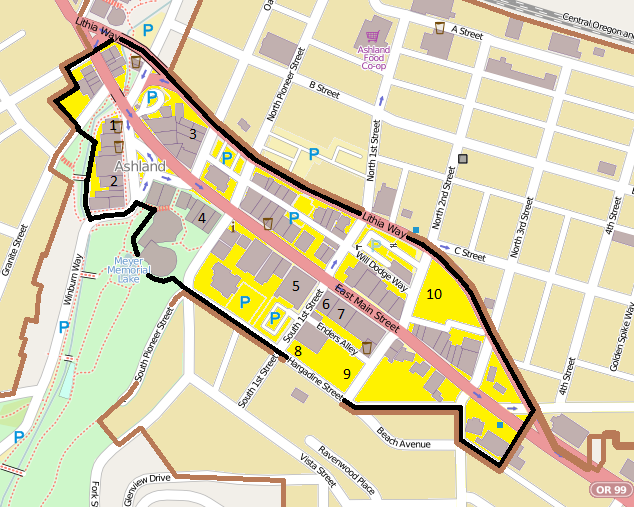
Map showing boundaries of the district

The listing included 55 contributing buildings and six contributing objects, as well as 26 non-contributing buildings and one non-contributing object. Eleven buildings were already separately listed on the National Register. Buildings include:

- Ashland Masonic Lodge Building, NRHP-listed in 1992
- Ashland IOOF Building, or IOOF Building NRHP-listed in 1978
- Citizen's Banking & Trust Co. Building, 232-242 E. Main St., NRHP-listed in 1985
- Enders Building, 250–300 E. Main St., NRHP-listed in 1986
- First Baptist Church (1911), 241 Hargadine Street, NRHP-listed in 1979
- First National Bank, NRHP-listed in 1980
- Ashland Springs Hotel, also known as the Lithia Springs Hotel and as the Mark Antony Motor Lodge, NRHP-listed in 1978
- Fordyce & Julia Roper House, NRHP-listed in 1985
- Trinity Episcopal Church, NRHP-listed in 1984
- Vaupel Store and Oregon Hotel Building, NRHP-listed in 1980
- Whittle Garage Building, NRHP-listed in 1997, and
- Ashland's City Hall.

Contributing objects include:

- Carter Memorial Fountain

== See also ==
- National Register of Historic Places listings in Jackson County, Oregon
