= Glen Jackson =

Glen Jackson may refer to:

- Glen Jackson (rugby union) (born 1975), former New Zealand rugby union player, subsequently an international referee
- Glen Jackson (Canadian football) (born 1954), Canadian Football League player

== See also ==
- Glenn Jackson (1902–1980), American businessman and transportation planner
