= Ashland Hills Hotel and Suites =

Hotel in Ashland, Oregon, U.S.

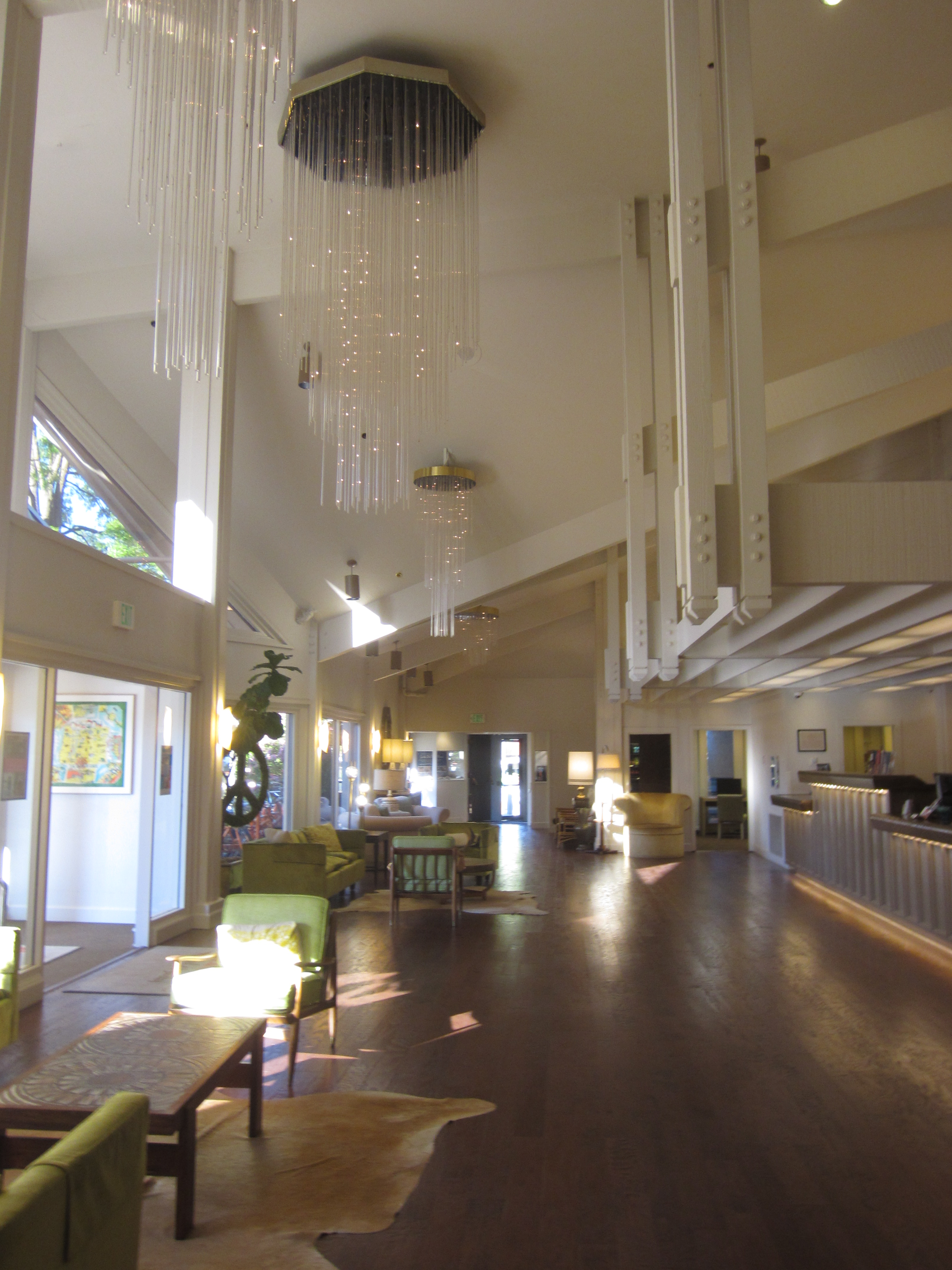
- Lobby interior, 2019
- Interactive map of the Ashland Hills Hotel and Suites area

General information
- Location: 2525 Ashland Street, Ashland, Oregon, United States
- Coordinates: 42.1868°N 122.6627°W

Website
- ashlandhillshotel.com

Ashland Hills Hotel and Suites (formerly Ashland Hills and Windmill Inn) is a hotel and event venue in Ashland, Oregon, United States.

== Description and history ==
The 14-acre (5.7 ha) site is among the largest hotels in Southern Oregon. The business was owned by Doug and Becky Neuman, as of 2014. Ashland Hills has mid-century modern decor.

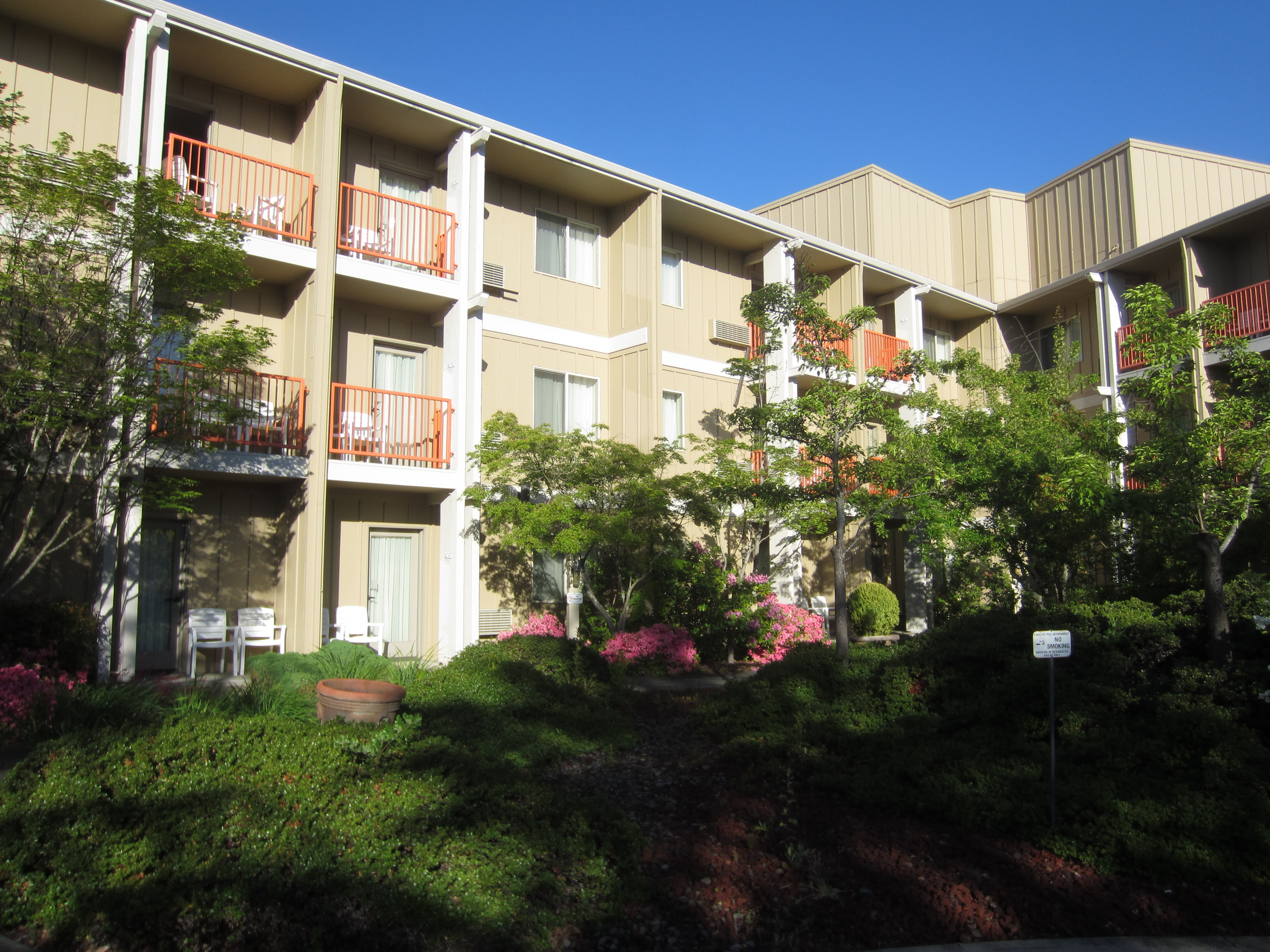

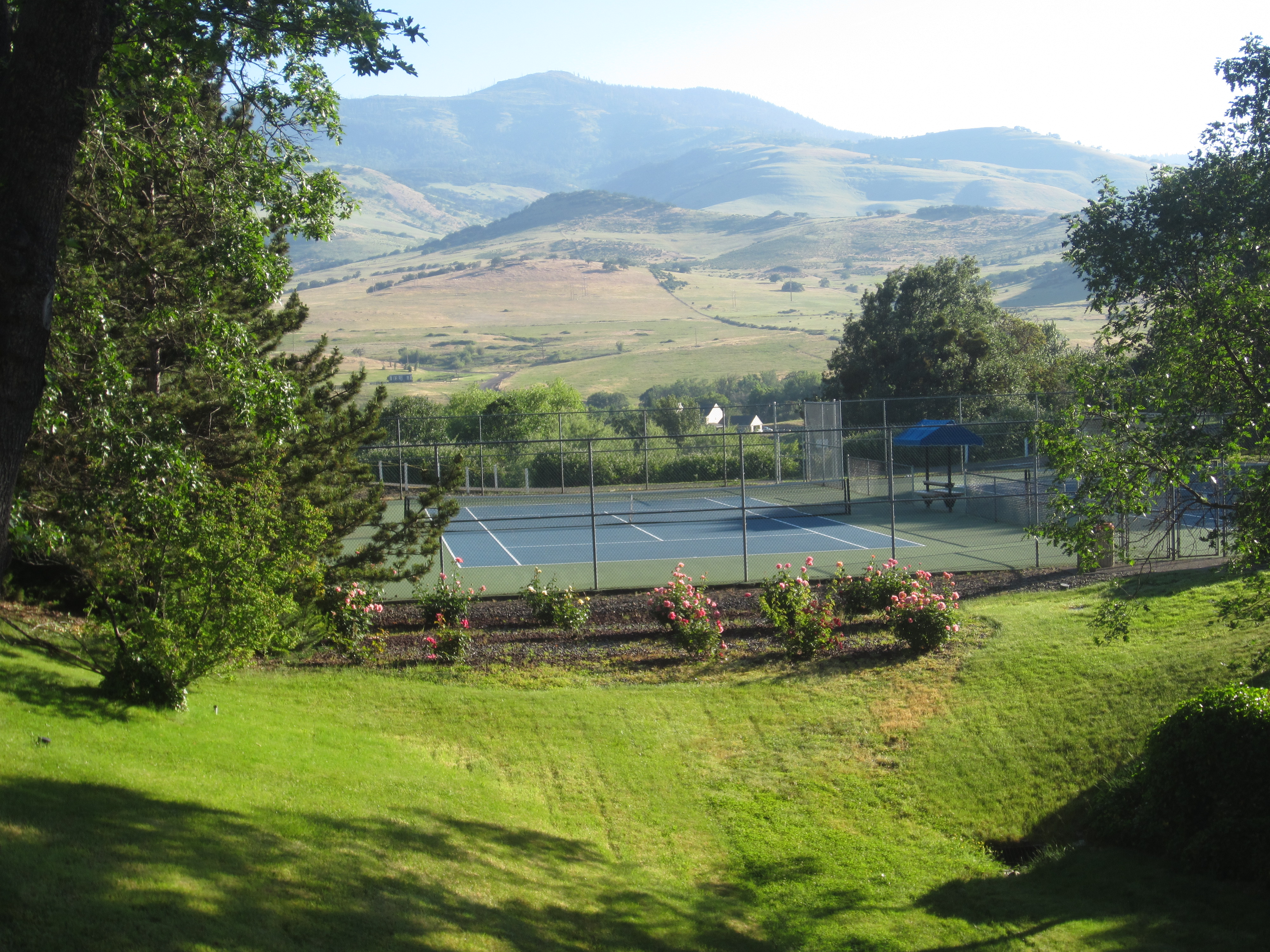

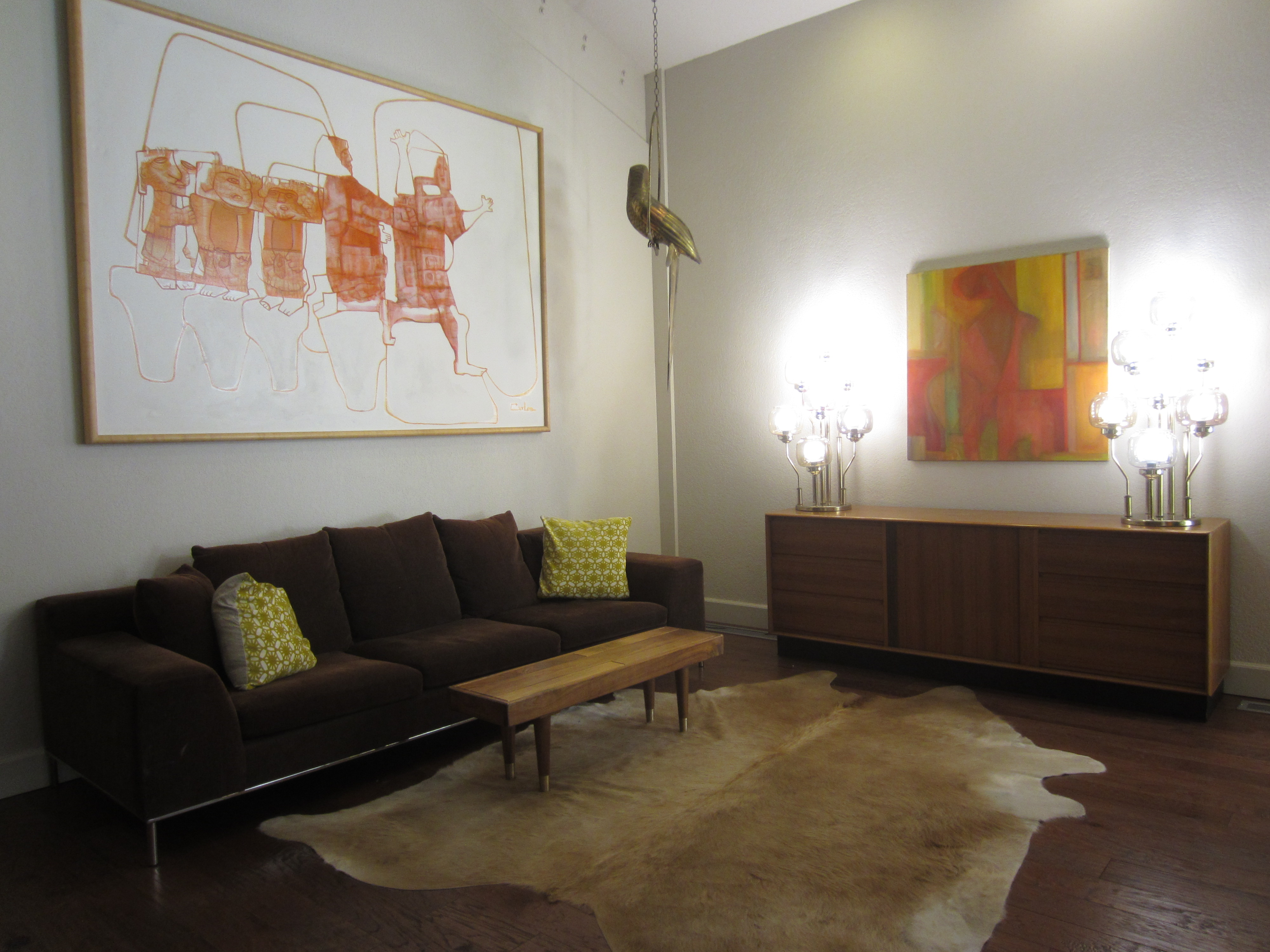

== See also ==
- Ashland Springs Hotel
