= Next Stage Repertory Company =

Acting company in Medford, Oregon

- Next Stage Repertory Company Logo
- Type: Theater Organization
- Founder: Doug Warner
- Founding date: 2011
- Executive Director: Stephen McCandless
- Location: Medford, Oregon
- Theaters used: The Craterian
- Number of seasons: 3
- Number of productions: 9

Next Stage Repertory Company is a professional-level acting company in Medford, Oregon, that is produced by Craterian Performances along with Teen Musical Theater of Oregon. Next Stage has put on plays such as Talley's Folly, The Glass Menagerie, and Molly Sweeney. Next Stage commonly produces four productions a year that star actors local to the Rogue Valley.

== List of full productions ==
=== 2011–2012 season ===
- Talley's Folly
- The Decorator
- The Wild Guys
- Molly Sweeney

=== 2012–2013 season ===
- Three Viewings
- All in the Timing
- Duet for One
- Brilliant Traces

=== 2013–2014 season ===
- The Glass Menagerie
- Old Time Traveling Radio Show
- Collected Stories
- The Spitfire Grill
