= Barnum Hotel =

- U.S. National Register of Historic Places
- U.S. Historic district – Contributing property
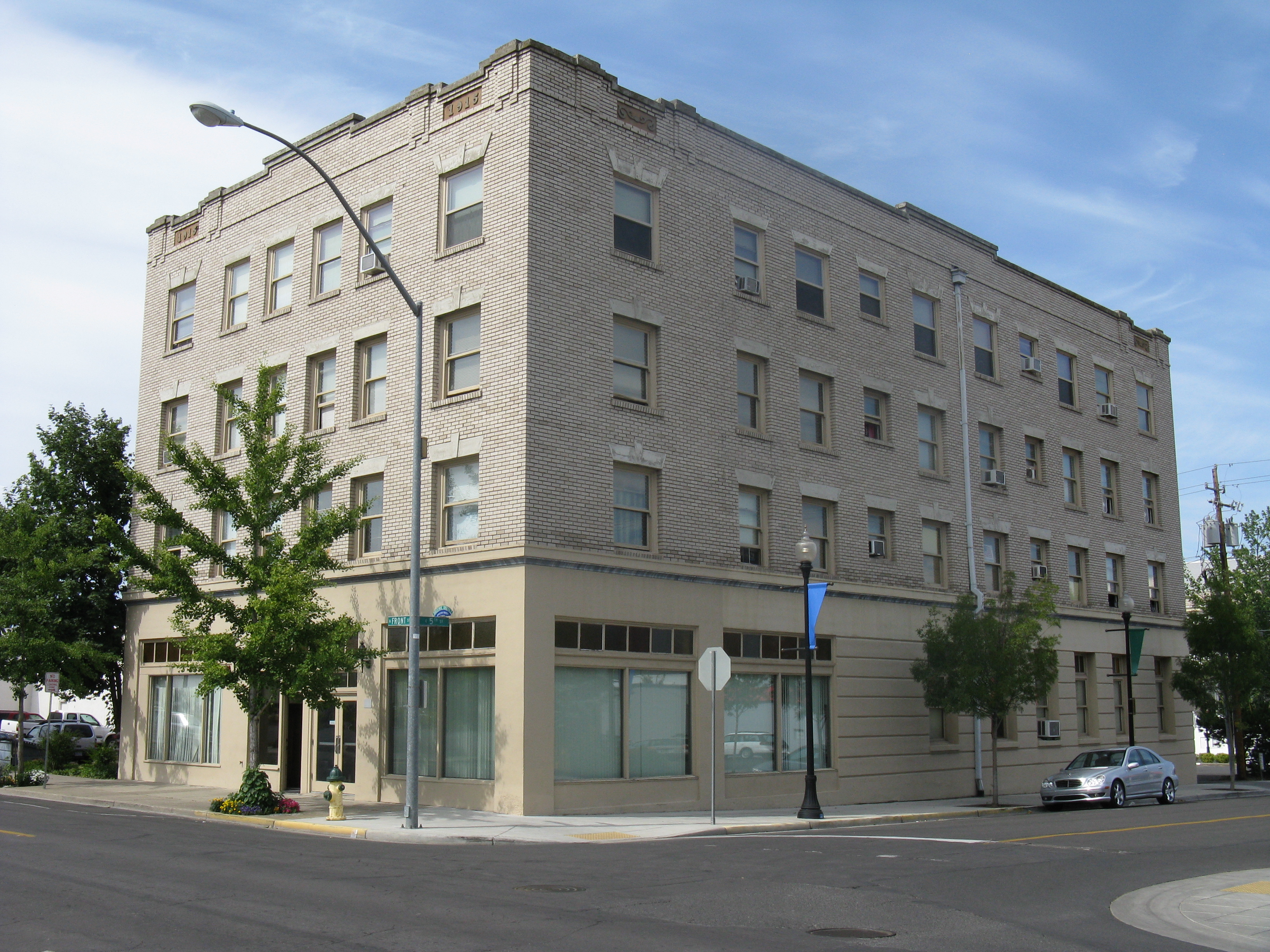

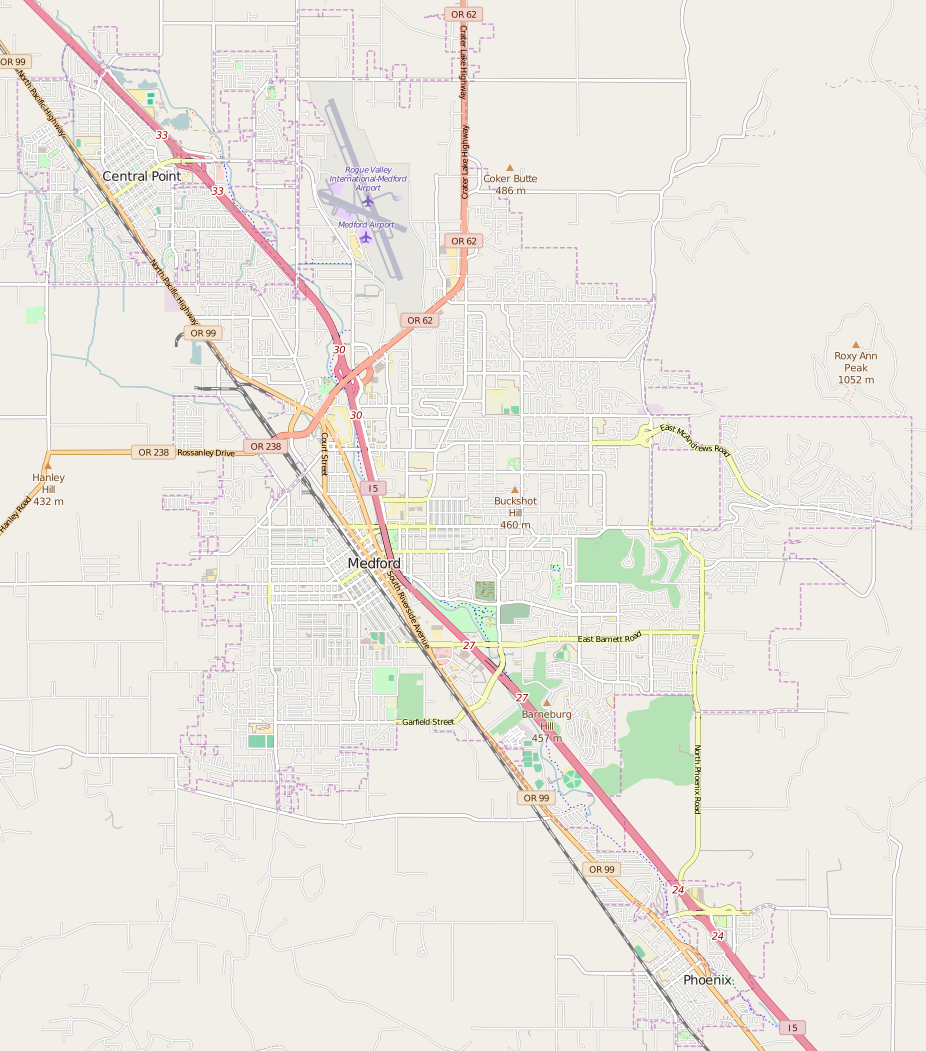
- Location within Medford OR Location within Oregon
- Location: 204 N Front St, Medford, Oregon
- Coordinates: 42°19′41″N 122°52′28″W
- Area: less than one acre
- Built: 1914
- Architect: Frank Chamberlain Clark
- Part of: Medford Downtown Historic District (ID98000949)
- NRHP reference No.: 84003009
- Added to NRHP: March 22, 1984

The Barnum Hotel, also known as the Hotel Grand, is located in Medford in the U.S. state of Oregon.

It was designed by noted southern Oregon architect Frank Chamberlain Clark and built in the heart of Medford's railroad district in 1914-1915 as a business venture of William S. Barnum, owner of the Rogue River Valley Railway Company. Building costs were estimated at $75,000.

The four-story American Renaissance Style building was designed to serve railroad travelers and local residents who desired modest accommodations.

The hotel was owned by William S. Barnum until December 14, 1927, when it was sold to Mr. and Mrs. J. S. Goswick and renamed the Hotel Grand. It changed ownership several times between 1948 and 1955, and in 1955 was purchased by the Grand Hotel Company who operated it until April 1980. Hotel operations ceased in 1980 and the building remained vacant until 1984. In 1984 it was purchased by developers, extensively remodeled, and converted into low-income apartments.

The building was purchased by the Housing Authority of Jackson County in May 2009 for $850,000. It was refurbished and renamed Grand Apartments.

The building was listed on the National Register of Historic Places in 1984.
