= Government Island (Oregon) =

Island on the Columbia River in Oregon, United States

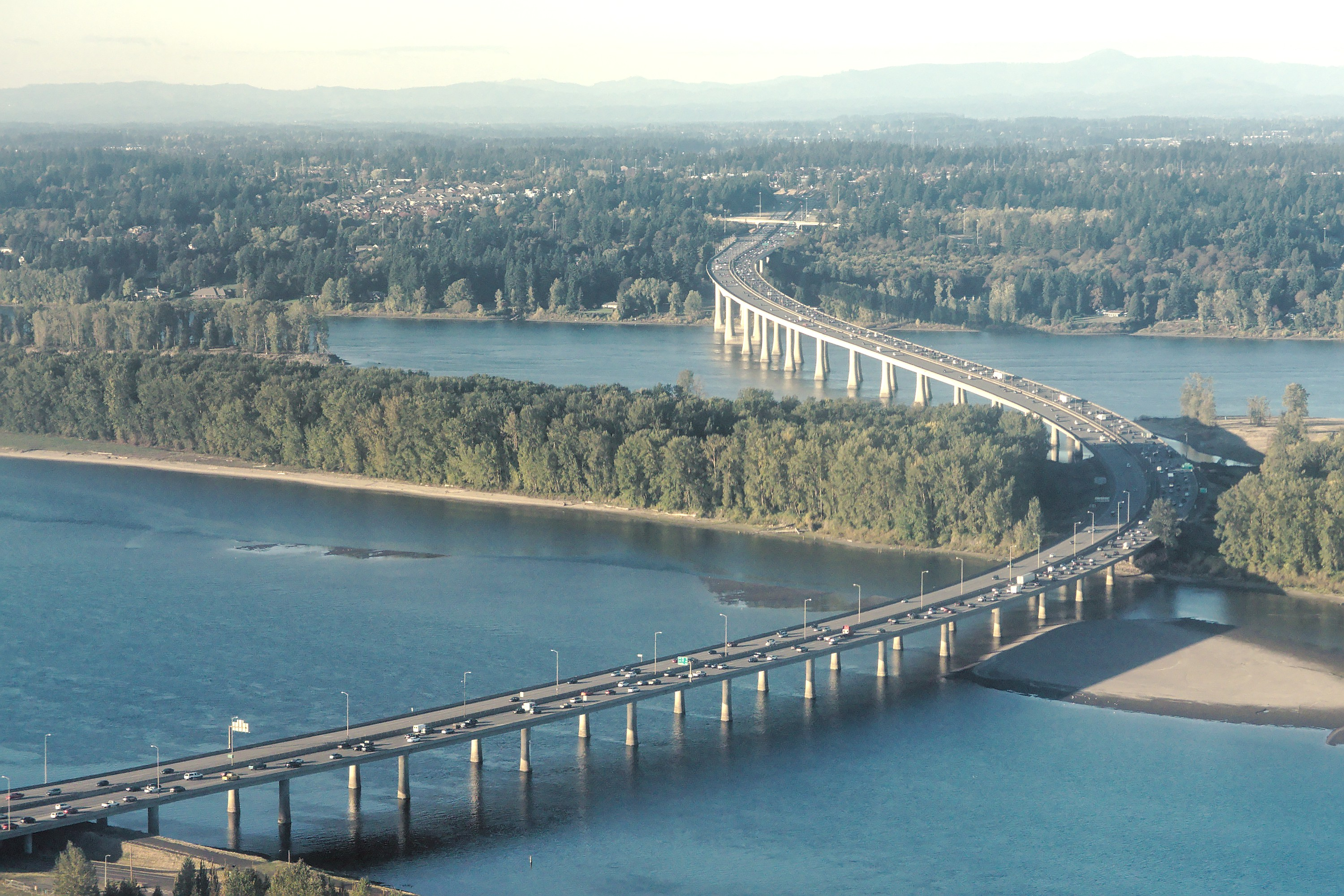
- The Glenn Jackson Bridge (on I-205) crossing over Government Island
- Interactive map of Government Island

Geography
- Location: Columbia River
- Coordinates: 45°34′30″N 122°30′29″W

Administration
- United States

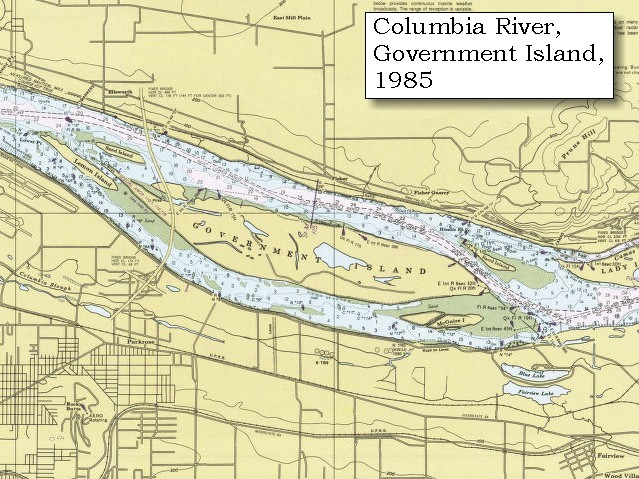
Map of Government Island

Government Island is a 1,760-acre (710 ha) island in the Columbia River north of Portland, in Multnomah County, in the U.S. state of Oregon. Though Interstate 205 passes over it on the Glenn L. Jackson Memorial Bridge, access to the island is only by boat.

The Government Island State Recreation Area includes 15 miles of shoreline, with two docks on the northern side of the island. The interior of the island is accessible only by permit and contains protected natural areas, such as Jewett Lake. Camping is permitted below the vegetation line around the perimeter of the island. Picnic tables and restrooms can be found in these areas as well.

Government Island is home to a variety of animals, notably a great blue heron colony that has been on the island for at least a decade. Many threatened or endangered wildlife species live on the island, including red-legged frog, pileated woodpecker, little willow flycatcher, olive-sided flycatcher, western meadowlark, horned grebe, red-necked grebe, bufflehead, purple martin, and possibly the endangered Columbian white-tailed deer.

Government Island's first documented non-indigenous visitors were British explorer William Robert Broughton in 1792 and American explorers Lewis and Clark in 1805. The island acquired its current name after being appropriated by the U.S. military in 1850 to grow hay. An old barn and other structures can be found on the interior of the island from when it was privately owned and settled by a small number of families.

Most of the island is owned by the Port of Portland. The Port acquired the entire island, along with the adjacent Lemon Island (45°35′33″N 122°34′00″W) and McGuire Island (45°33′49″N 122°27′54″W), in 1969 in order to expand nearby Portland International Airport; a competing plan from the Multnomah County Board of Commissioners proposed using the island for recreational uses instead of airport expansion. Though those plans have been abandoned, the Port continues to control the land to prevent any uses incompatible with its location under the airport's primary flight path. In 1999 the Port sold 224 acres (91 ha) of the island to Metro, a regional government agency, and leased the remainder to the Oregon Parks and Recreation Department for 99 years. In July 2014, three people were stabbed on Lemon Island during a party of several hundred people that was hosted there without a permit from Oregon Parks & Recreation.
