= Craterian Theater =

Coordinates: 42°19′34.28″N 122°52′18.35″W

- The Craterian Theater at the Collier Center for the Performing Arts
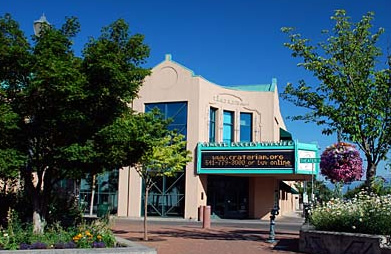
- The Craterian from Vogel Plaza
- Interactive map of Craterian Theater
- Address: 23 South Central Ave; Medford, Oregon; United States
- Owner: Craterian Performance Company
- Capacity: 732

Construction
- Opened: 1924-October-20
- Rebuilt: 1996-1997
- Architect: Frank Chamberlain Clark

Website
- craterian.org

The Craterian Theater at the Collier Center for the Performing Arts is a state-of-the-art performing arts center located in Medford, Oregon.

While the theater has a seating capacity of 732, the theater will frequently hold large, national concerts, dance, and theatrical tours. The Craterian Theater facility is also used for community performances, rehearsals, classes, conferences, receptions, and more. The Theater holds many different types of performances including Broadway tours, traveling musicians, and local performances for organizations such as the Rogue Valley Symphony and the Rogue Valley Chorale.

The Craterian Theater also has two theater companies that it has adopted including Teen Musical Theater of Oregon and Next Stage Repertory Company.

== History ==
In 1923, the Page Theater burned down after ten years of performances. At the time there were no other theaters in Medford with a large capacity, so in 1924 business owner Jeremiah Henry Cooley and attorney Porter Joseph Neff collaborated to construct one. The building was designed by architect Frank Chamberlain Clark and would be leased to George A. Hunt. The original name of the theater was decided by a 1925 contest held with a $25 prize. The winning entry, Hunt's Craterian Theater, was submitted by a Mrs. W.P. Brooks, a resident of Medford, who named it after nearby Crater Lake.

The building was renamed "Craterian Ginger Rogers Theater" in 1997 after the building was restored, in honor of Ginger Rogers, an actress who performed there as early as 1926.

As of August 30, 2012, the theater has been renamed The Craterian Theater at The Collier Center for the Performing Arts, named after James Collier, a large benefactor in the Rogue Valley.
