= Glenn L. Jackson Memorial Bridge =

Bridge between Oregon and Washington, United States

Glenn Jackson Memorial Bridge
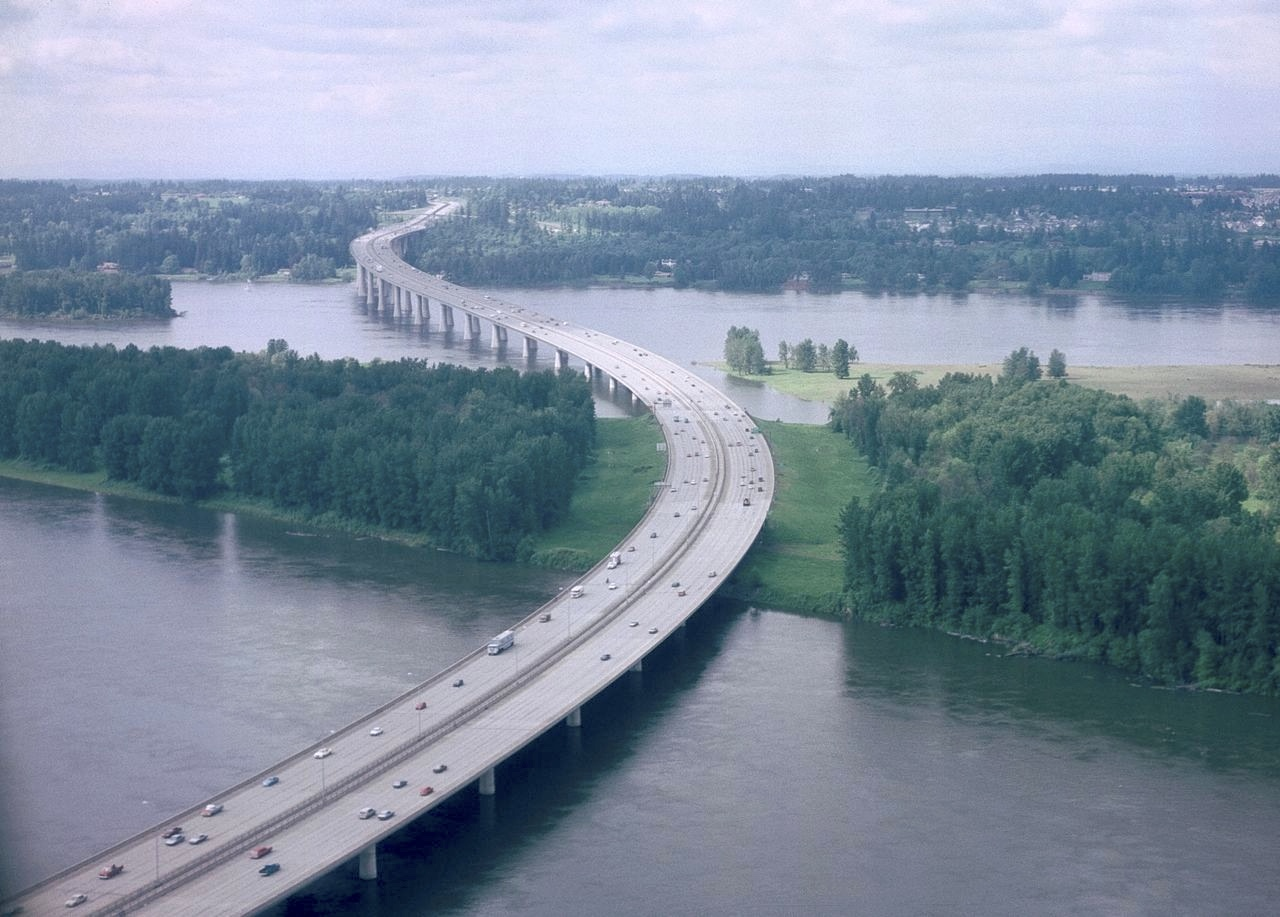
- Aerial view, looking north
- Coordinates: 45°35′35″N 122°32′55″W
- Carries: 8 lanes of I-205
- Crosses: Columbia River
- Locale: Portland, Oregon to Vancouver, Washington
- Maintained by: Oregon Department of Transportation

Characteristics
- Design: Concrete segmental bridge
- Longest span: 600 ft (183 m)
- Clearance below: 144 ft (43.9 m)

History
- Opened: December 15, 1982

Statistics
- Daily traffic: 154,492 (2023)

Location
- Interactive map of Glenn Jackson Memorial Bridge

The Glenn L. Jackson Memorial Bridge, or I-205 Bridge, is a segmental bridge that spans the Columbia River between Portland, Oregon, and Vancouver, Washington. It carries Interstate 205, a freeway bypass of Portland, Oregon. It is one of two publicly accessible bridges connecting Portland to Vancouver, the other being the Interstate Bridge. The structure is maintained by the Oregon Department of Transportation.

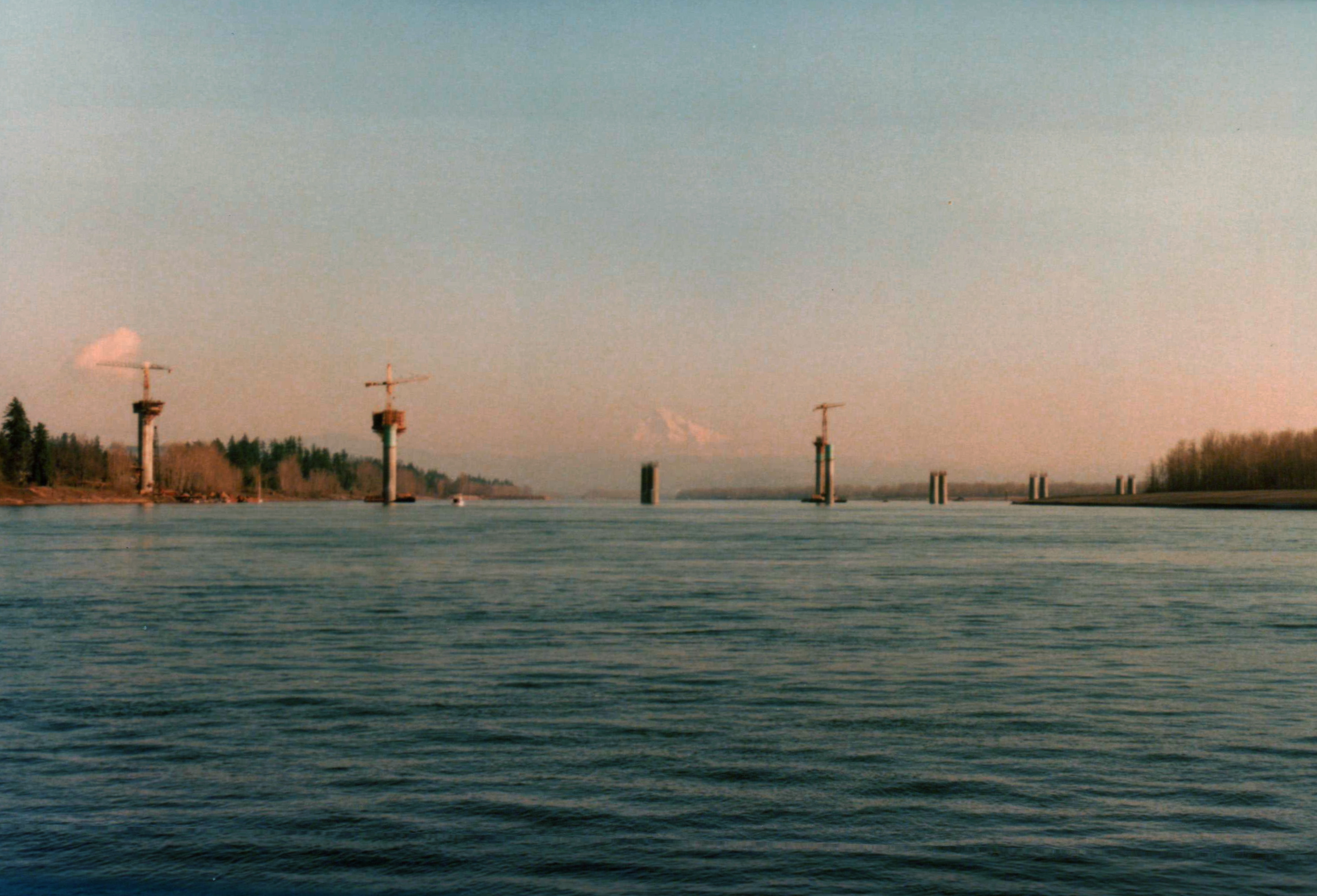
Under construction, looking east from the Columbia River c. 1980–81

Planning for the structure began in earnest in 1964 when it was designated as part of the East Portland Freeway (later renamed Veteran's Memorial Freeway), Interstate 205. Construction began in August 1977. In order to avoid disrupting river traffic, the bridge was built one segment at a time. The segments, weighing upwards of 200 tons, were cast 4 miles (6.4 km) downstream and barged into place. The bridge was opened on December 15, 1982. The finished project cost was $169.6 million: $155.7 million from federal funds, $4 million from Washington state funds and $9.9 million from Oregon state funds. Three men died during its construction. The bridge was closed to traffic on May 15, 1983, for a one-day festival named "People's Day", where 125,000 pedestrians crossed the bridge.

It is a twin structure with four lanes in each direction and a 9-foot-wide (2.7 m) bicycle and pedestrian path in between. The bridge is 7,460 ft (2,270 m) long from the Washington side of the river to Government Island and another 3,120 ft (951 m) in length from Government Island to the Oregon side of the river. The main span, near the Washington side, is 600 ft (183 m) long with 144 ft (44 m) of vertical clearance at low river levels. The bridge was named for Glenn Jackson, the chairman of the Oregon State Highway Commission and later the Oregon Economic Development Commission.

The average weekday traffic during 2019 was 166,152 vehicles. In 2020, ODOT and WSDOT began a one-year pilot project to allow C-Tran buses to use the shoulders of I-205 over the bridge in order to bypass congestion. Traffic is expected to increase significantly once tolls begin on the Interstate Bridge as part of the Interstate Bridge Replacement Program.

No vehicle, bicycle or pedestrian access to Government Island is available from the bridge.

== Multi-use path ==
A multi-use path for pedestrians and cyclists runs along the center of the bridge. This multi-use path connects to two trailheads at each end of the bridge as well as the I-205 Trail through Portland. The path lacks access to Government Island.
