= Glenn Jackson =

American businessman (1902–1980)

Glenn L. Jackson
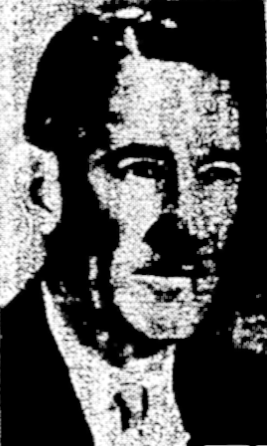

Chairman of Oregon State Highway Commission
- In office 1959–1979
- Governor: Mark Hatfield, Tom McCall, Robert Straub

Personal details
- Born: April 27, 1902 Albany, Oregon
- Died: June 20, 1980 (aged 78) Portland, Oregon
- Party: Republican
- Spouse: Helen Simpson
- Children: 1 daughter
- Education: Oregon State University (BS)

Military service
- Allegiance: United States
- Branch/service: United States Army Air Forces
- Battles/wars: World War II

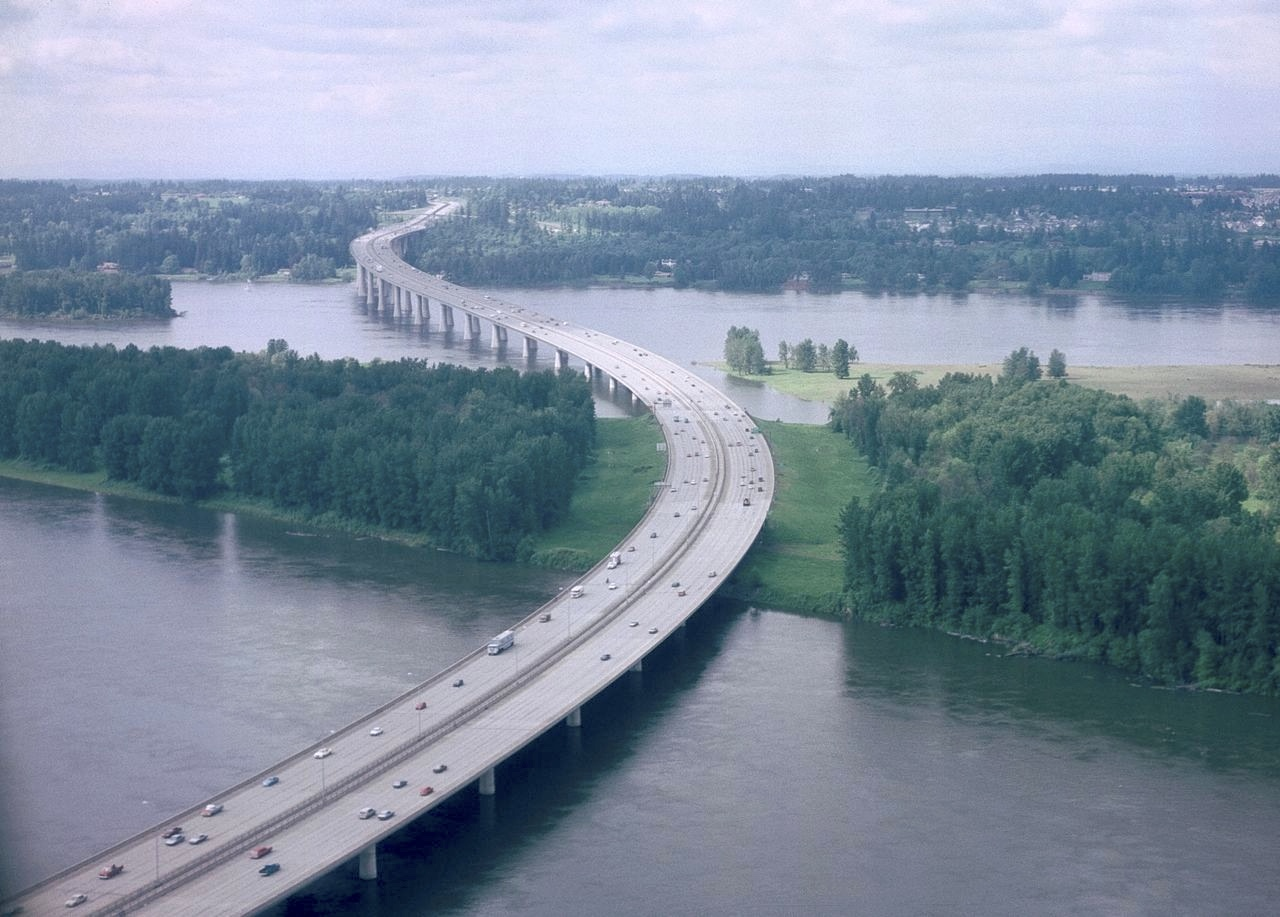
Aerial view of the Glenn L. Jackson Memorial Bridge from a commercial airliner approaching Portland International Airport (in Oregon). The bridge carries Interstate 205 across the Columbia River, connecting Oregon with Washington. This view is looking north, towards Washington. The land in the middle of the photo is Government Island.

Glenn L. Jackson (nickname "Mr. Oregon"; April 27, 1902 – June 20, 1980) was an American engineer, influential Oregon transportation planner, and businessman. He made a strong mark on the state as a 20-year member, and later chair, of the Oregon State Highway Commission, later known as the Oregon Transportation Commission. He was initially appointed to the commission by Governor Mark Hatfield in 1959. He became chair in 1962, and was reappointed by Governors Tom McCall and Robert Straub. Jackson directed the planning and construction of 700 miles (1,100 km) of freeway and more than 800 bridges, including the Fremont, Astoria–Megler, and Marquam bridges.

== Early life and education ==
Glenn Jackson was born to William L. and Minnie Jackson, in Albany, Oregon, on April 27, 1902. His father came to Oregon in 1877. His mother was a native of Oregon, born on a donation land claim in Yamhill County, Oregon, in 1872. The original donation land claim remains in the extended Jackson family, reflecting the family’s long-standing roots in the Willamette Valley. While teaching, Mr. and Mrs. Jackson met; both were Linn County, Oregon schoolteachers. William Jackson was later elected superintendent of Linn County schools at the turn of the 20th century and eventually became co-publisher of the Albany Democrat-Herald.

Although he was expelled from high school and admitted to Oregon State University on a provisional basis, Jackson earned a commerce degree in 1925.

== Business Career ==
After graduating from Oregon State University, Jackson joined Mountain States Power Company in Albany, Oregon, as a salesman. He became sales manager in 1927 and vice president in 1929. That same year, he became vice president and director of California Oregon Power Company (COPCO) in Medford, Oregon.

After World War II, Jackson continued to work for COPCO. When COPCO merged with Pacific Power & Light (PP&L) (now a division of PacifiCorp) in 1961, he became vice-chairman of the board and later chairman, serving until his retirement in 1972. He also served on the boards of Standard Insurance Company, the U.S. National Bank of Oregon, Fred Meyer, Inc., and the U.S. Chamber of Commerce. Jackson played a major role in developing White City, an industrial and residential park, on the site of Camp White near Medford, Oregon.

He and his sister inherited a majority share of the Albany Democrat-Herald in 1949. Jackson later bought out the co-publisher and expanded the company by acquiring nine other Oregon weekly newspapers, retaining ownership until his death in 1980.

Jackson was also a trustee of numerous civic and educational organizations, including the Agri-Business Council of Oregon, St. Vincent Medical Foundation, Willamette University, Linfield College Board of Associates, Oregon State University Foundation, Rogue Valley Memorial Hospital, Mercy Flights Inc, Rogue Valley Manor, Foundation of Oregon Research & Education, Indian Festival of Arts Inc. and Columbia River Maritime Museum.

In addition to his corporate and civic roles, Jackson operated several private business ventures in southern Oregon. He owned and operated a cattle ranch, maintaining long-term ties to the region's agricultural community. He also majority-owned the Rouge Valley Country Club in Medford from 1938 until his death, with the only hiatus while he was in the military. Jackson further expanded into aviation, owning a regional air charter company that later became part of the consolidation of small Pacific Northwest carriers that formed Horizon Air, linking him to early development of regional commercial aviation in Oregon.

== Military Service ==
Jackson served in the United States Army Air Forces during World War II, ultimately attaining the rank of colonel. He was assigned as Executive Officer to General Ira C. Eaker, commander of the Eighth Air Force, during operations in Italy. His service earned him multiple decorations, including the Bronze Star, Legion of Merit, Order of the British Empire, and Crown of Italy.

== Public Service and Political Influence ==
Jackson was appointed by Governor Mark Hatfield to the Oregon State Highway Commission in 1959, and served as its chair from 1962 to 1979. Under his leadership, Oregon built more than 700 miles of freeway and over 800 bridges, including major structures such as the Fremont Bridge, Marquam Bridge, and Astoria-Megler Bridge. Jackson also recognized early the limitations of automobile-centric planning and became an advocate for mass transit.

Though a Republican, Jackson supported candidates across party lines and became known as a trusted adviser to multiple Oregon governors, most notably Tom McCall. His ability to navigate political, business, and civic networks earned him the informal title "Mr. Oregon."

== Legacy ==
Jackson's influence on Oregon's transportation system remains visible in the state's modern infrastructure. The Interstate 205 bridge over the Columbia River was named the Glenn L. Jackson Memorial Bridge in recognition of his contributions. His leadership in utilities, transportation, and public policy helped shape Oregon's mid-20th-century development, and he is widely regarded as one of the state's most consequential civic figures.

Jackson's daughter, Cynthia Jackson, remained connected to Oregon civic and community life and helped preserve aspects of her father's legacy after his death. According to the Oregon Department of Transportation, she was appointed to the Oregon Transportation Commission in 1987 and was its first female commissioner.

The Glenn Jackson Scholarship Program was established to honor his commitment to public service and civic leadership. Administered through the Oregon Department of Transportation, the program provides annual scholarships to Oregon students pursuing studies related to transportation, engineering, public policy, and community development, continuing Jackson’s legacy of investing in the state’s future leaders.

Jackson leased, then purchased, in 1946, a fashionable Colonial Revival house in Medford that was designed by noted architect Frank Chamberlain Clark. The house, known as the Clark-Jackson House, is listed on the National Register of Historic Places.

== Death ==
Jackson died of cancer at the age of 78 on June 20, 1980, in Portland. His passing prompted tributes from political leaders, business executives, and civic organizations across Oregon, reflecting the breadth of his influence on the state's development.

== See also ==
- Conde McCullough
- Robert Moses
