= Frank Chamberlain Clark House =

Historic house in Oregon, United States

- U.S. National Register of Historic Places
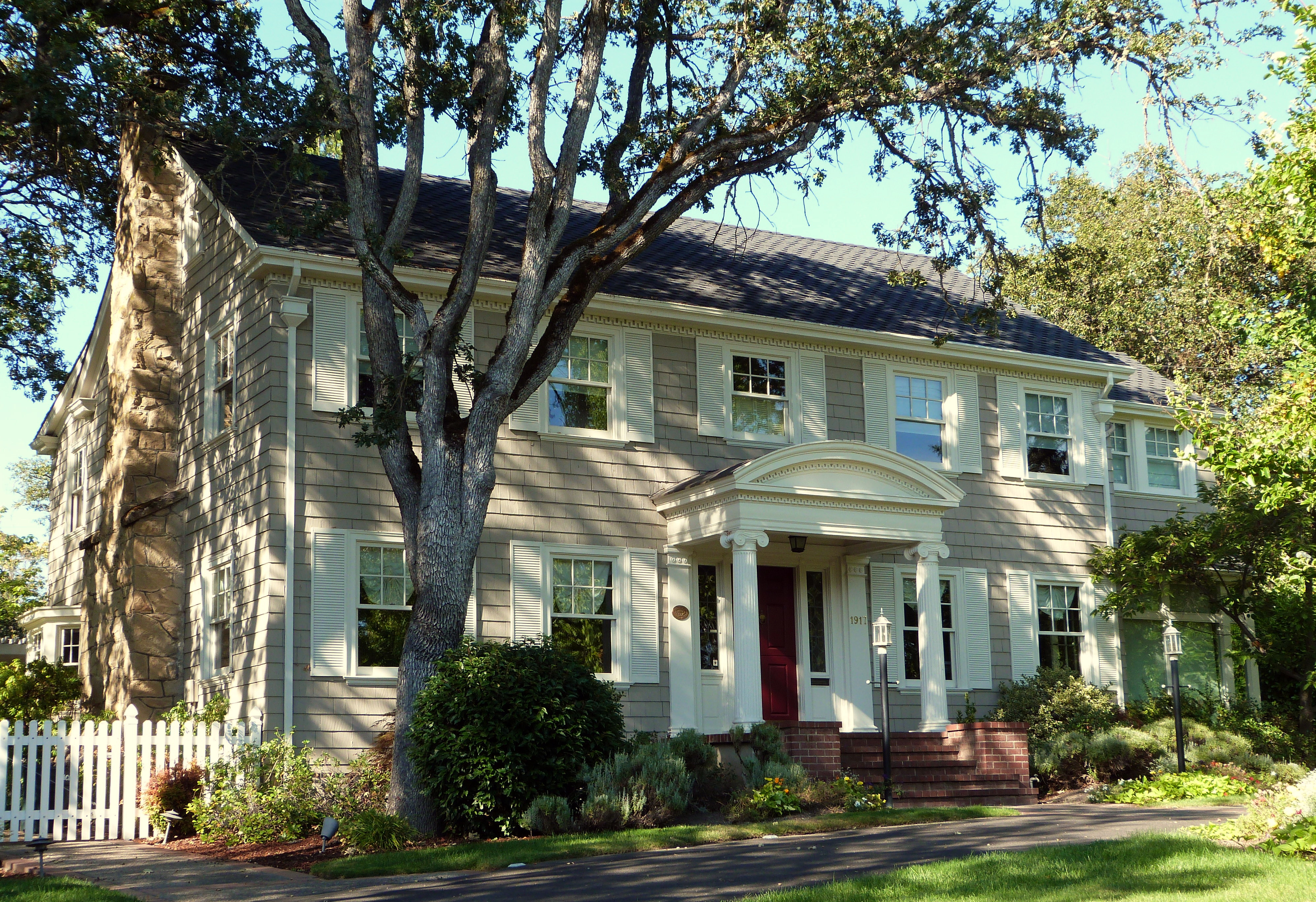

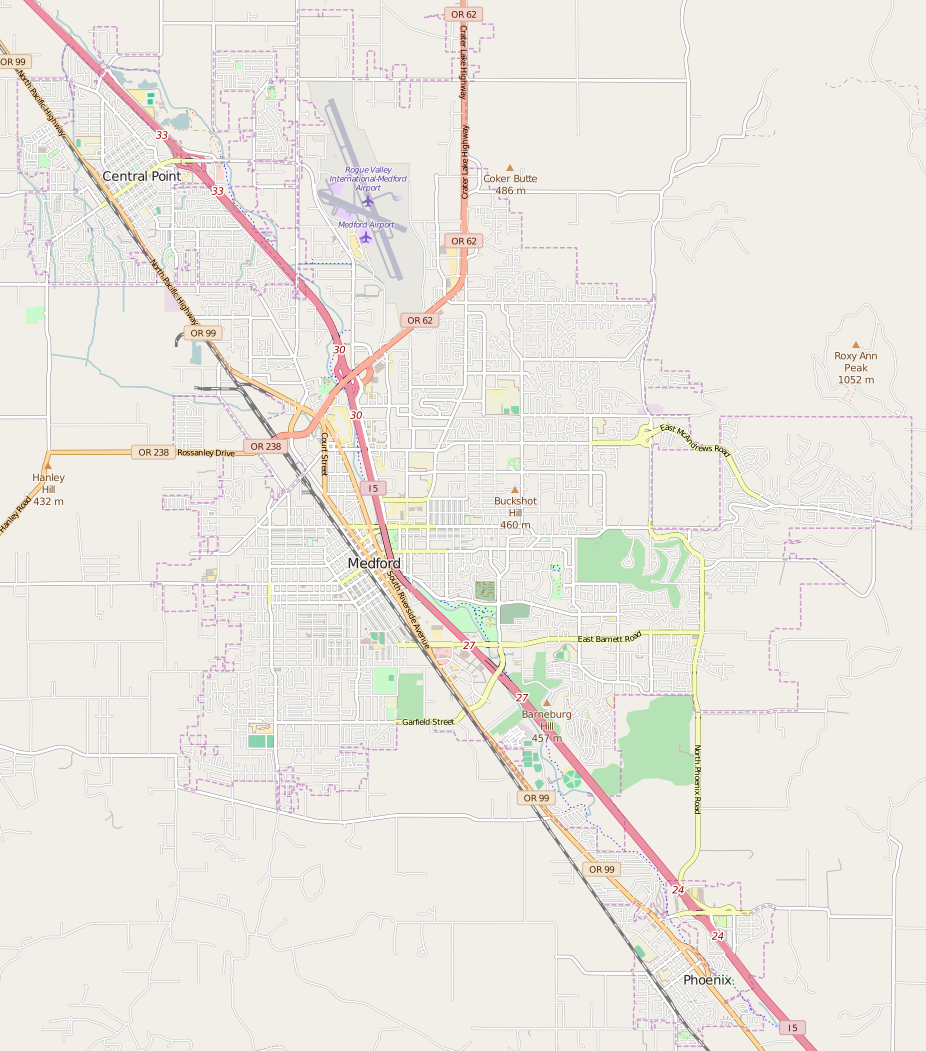
- Location within Medford OR Location within Oregon
- Location: 1917 E. Main St., Medford, Oregon
- Coordinates: 42°19′43″N 122°50′45″W
- Area: 0.8 acres (0.32 ha)
- Built: 1930
- Architect: Frank Chamberlain Clark
- Architectural style: Colonial Revival
- NRHP reference No.: 82001504
- Added to NRHP: October 29, 1982

The Frank Chamberlain Clark House in Medford, Oregon was designed by architect Frank Chamberlain Clark (1872–1957) in Colonial Revival style and was built in 1930. It was listed on the U.S. National Register of Historic Places in 1982.

Clark designed the house at the height of his prolific career. Clark had arrived in southern Oregon in 1902 and retired in 1945.

Clark lived in the house for only three years. Due to financial setbacks of the Great Depression, he leased it out, to California-Oregon Power Company executives John C. Boyle and Glenn L. Jackson. Jackson became important in Oregon as long-time chairman of the Oregon Highway Commission and bought the property from Clark in 1946.
