= Frank Chamberlain Clark =

American architect

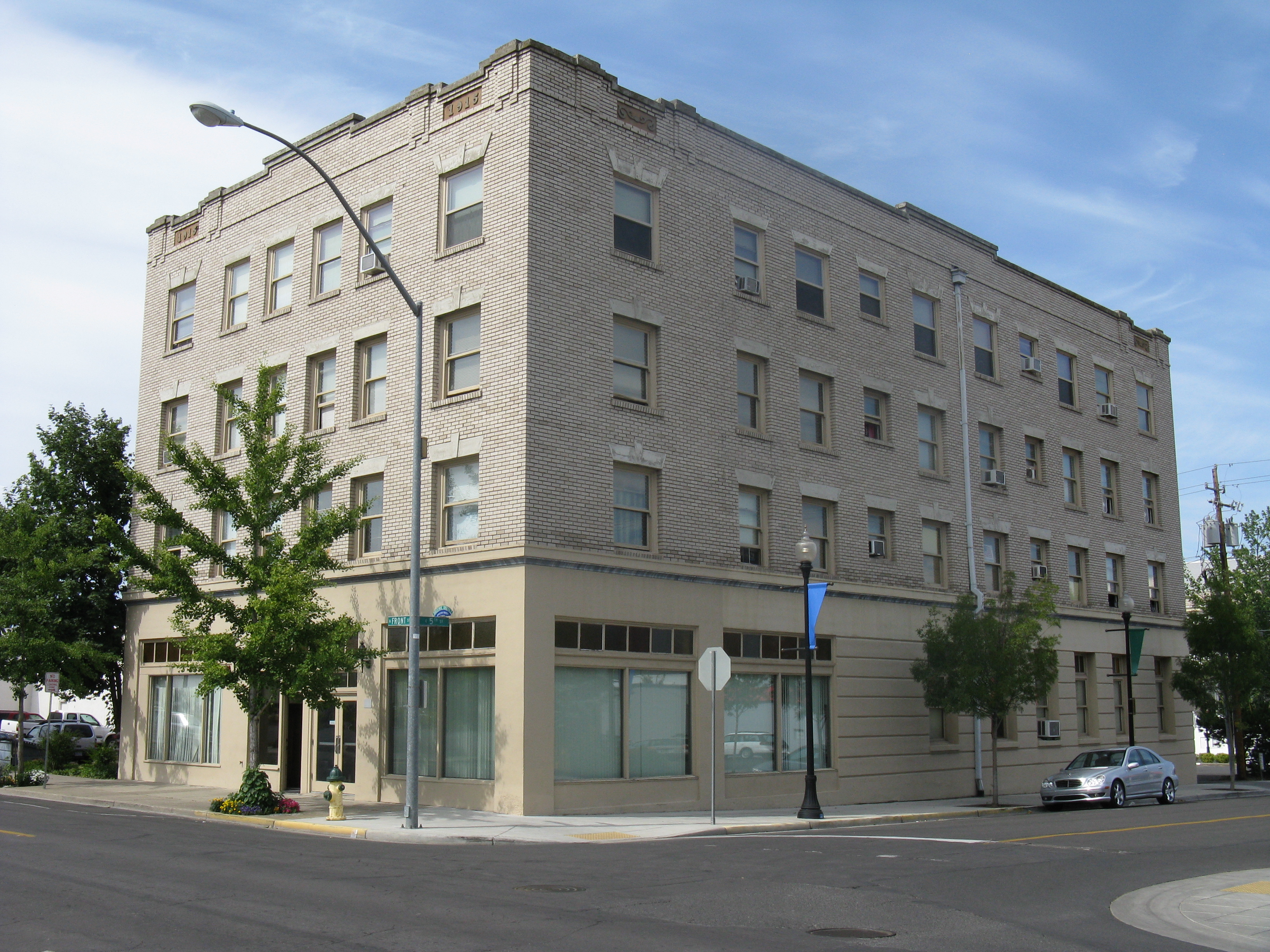
Barnum Hotel, from 1914, in Medford

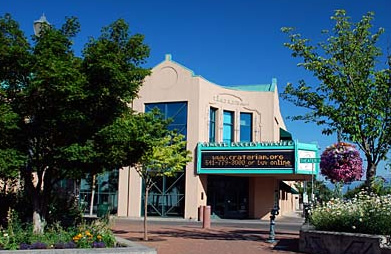
Craterian Ginger Rogers Theater

Frank Chamberlain Clark (1872–1957) was an American architect active in Southern Oregon. Many of his works are listed on the National Register of Historic Places (NRHP).

Clark has been said to be "the leading architect of the Rogue River Valley from the time of his arrival in southern Oregon in 1902 to his retirement in 1945."

Clark was joined in partnership by Robert Keeney in 1935.

== Works ==
All are in Oregon, unless indicated otherwise

=== in chronological order ===
- Ashland Masonic Lodge Building (1909), 25 N Main St, Ashland, NRHP-listed
- First Baptist Church (1911), 241 Hargadine St, Ashland, NRHP-listed
- Barnum Hotel (1914), 204 N Front St, Medford, NRHP-listed
- Craterian Ginger Rogers Theater (1924), Medford
- Holly Theatre (1929–30), 226 W 6th St, Medford, NRHP-listed
- Frank Chamberlain Clark House (1930), 1917 E Main St, Medford. Colonial Revival. NRHP-listed
- Chauncy M. Brewer House (1930), E. Main St., Medford. Colonial Revival.

=== not in chronological order ===
▪Ulrich House (1922), 839 Minnesota Ave., Medford. Colonial Revival

- Walter Bowne House, 1845 Old Stage Rd, Jacksonville, NRHP-listed
- BPOE Lodge No. 1168, 202 N Central Ave, Medford, NRHP-listed
- Victor and Bertha Bursell House, 3075 Hanley Rd, Central Point, NRHP-listed
- Carter-Fortmiller House, 514 Siskiyou Blvd, Ashland, NRHP-listed
- Chappell-Swedenburg House, 990 Siskiyou Blvd, Ashland, NRHP-listed
- Michael Clemens House, 612 NW 3rd St, Grants Pass, NRHP-listed
- Corning Court Ensemble, 5-16 Corning Ct, Medford, NRHP-listed
- E. Raymond Driver House, 4140 Old Stage Rd, Central Point, NRHP-listed
- Enders Building, 250-300 E Main St, Ashland, NRHP-listed
- Fluhrer Bakery Building, 29 N Holly St, Medford, NRHP-listed
- C. E. "Pop" Gates House, 1307 Queen Anne Ave, Medford, NRHP-listed
- Glenview Orchard Ensemble, 1395 Carpenter Hill Rd, Phoenix, NRHP-listed
- Edgar F. Hafer House, 426 W 6th St, Medford, NRHP-listed
- Liberty Building, 201 W Main St, Medford, NRHP-listed
- Medford Central Firehall, 110 E 6th St, Medford, NRHP-listed
- Humboldt Pracht House, 234 Vista St, Ashland, NRHP-listed
- Root-Banks House, 11 N Peach St (1000 W Main St), Medford, NRHP-listed
- Sparta Building, 12 N Riverside St, Medford, NRHP-listed
- Dr. Charles T. and Mary Sweeney House, 2336 Table Rock Rd, Medford, NRHP-listed
- George Taverner House, 912 Siskiyou Blvd, Ashland, NRHP-listed
- Henry Van Hoevenberg, Jr., House, 9130 Ramsey Canyon Rd, Gold Hill, NRHP-listed
