= Ashland Masonic Lodge Building =

- U.S. National Register of Historic Places
- U.S. Historic district – Contributing property
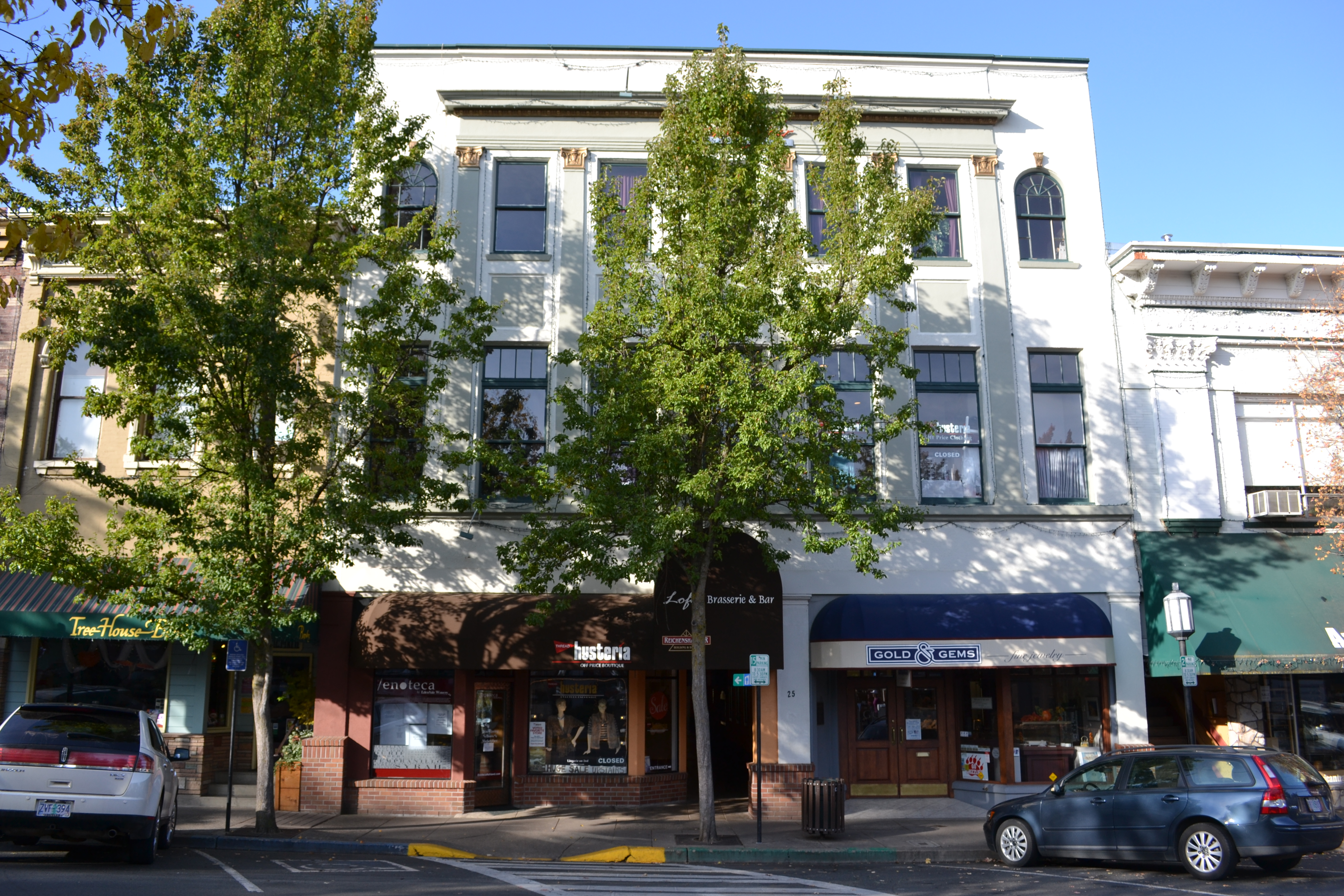
- The Ashland Masonic Lodge in 2011.

- Location within Oregon
- Location: 25 N. Main Street; Ashland, Oregon
- Coordinates: 42°11′49″N 122°42′57″W
- Area: 0.1 acres (0.040 ha)
- Built: 1880, 1909, 1928
- Architect: L. S. P. Marsh, Frank Chamberlain Clark
- Architectural style: Georgian Revival
- Part of: Ashland Downtown Historic District (ID00000446)
- NRHP reference No.: 92000663

Significant dates
- Added to NRHP: June 4, 1992
- Designated CP: May 5, 2000

The Ashland Masonic Lodge Building is a historic building located in Ashland, Oregon. Constructed in 1909 as a meeting hall for a local Masonic lodge, it was listed on the National Register of Historic Places in 1992.

It was built in 1880 as a two-story brick building in Italianate to a design by local contractor L.S.P. Marsh. It was expanded in its second floor in 1909 with design by local architect Frank C. Clark, and Clark also designed a third floor added in 1928 along with a remodeling of the building facade into Georgian style. The remodelling added a "a pilaster strip colonnade with stylized Corinthian capitals and full entablature framing the central five bays".

With a 50 feet (15 m) frontage, and its superior height of three stories, the building came to "dominate" the block of buildings defining the west side of Ashland's town square.

Renovations on the first floor followed a fire in 1959.

It was deemed significant for National Register listing in part as its main assembly hall, an upstairs "clear span space 45 feet wide and 55 feet long" with detailed ceiling beams, cornice moldings, pilasters and an encircling entablature, "is one of the few intact lodge rooms of pre-World War I vintage remaining in southern Oregon, and it is replete with historic furniture and equippage."

It was included again on the National Register in 2000 as a contributing building in the Ashland Downtown Historic District.
