= IOOF Building (Ashland, Oregon) =

- U.S. National Register of Historic Places
- U.S. Historic district – Contributing property
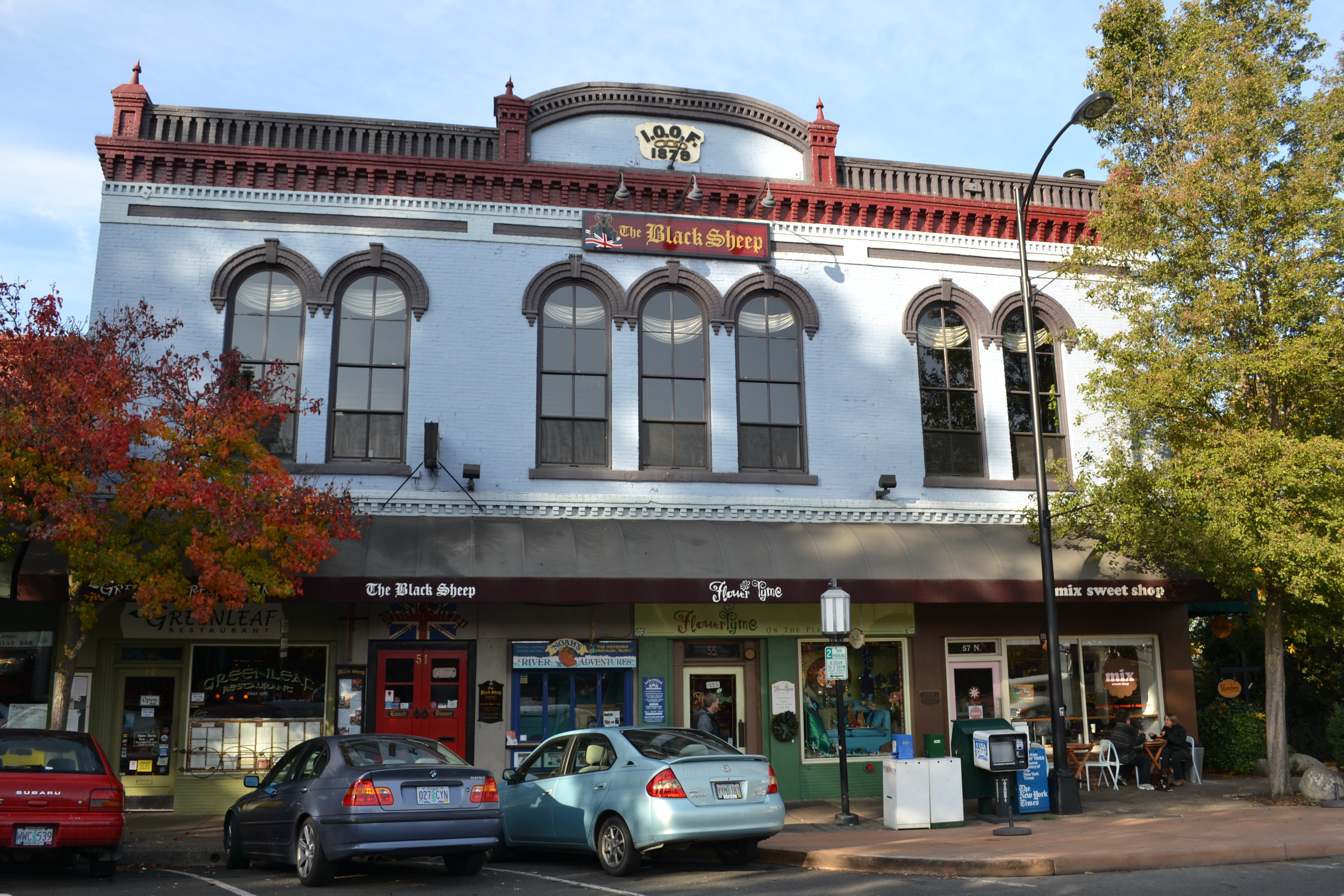
- The IOOF Building in 2011.

- Location within Oregon
- Location: 49–57 N. Main Street; Ashland, Oregon
- Coordinates: 42°11′52″N 122°42′57″W
- Built: 1879
- Built by: Jacob, Fox, Guerin
- Part of: Ashland Downtown Historic District (ID00000446)
- NRHP reference No.: 78002288

Significant dates
- Added to NRHP: February 17, 1978
- Designated CP: May 5, 2000

The IOOF Building in Ashland, Oregon, also known as Oddfellows Building, is a two-story eclectic-styled building in "The Plaza" area of Ashland that was built in 1879. Historically its second story served as a clubhouse of the local International Order of Odd Fellows chapter and the ground floor provided specialty store space. It was listed on the National Register of Historic Places in 1978, for its architecture. From its construction to 1978, the building had served well in the active "Plaza" area of Medford, and continued in its original purposes. Behind the building, by 1978 there was a landscaped park area which had been extended from nearby Lithia Park, where there was once a mill flume.

== History ==
The IOOF Building was built by Jacob, Fox, Guerin, a local builder.

The building replaced one that was destroyed in a fire on March 4, 1879.

It was individually listed on the National Register in 1978. It was included again on the National Register in 2000 as a contributing building in the Ashland Downtown Historic District.

== Description ==
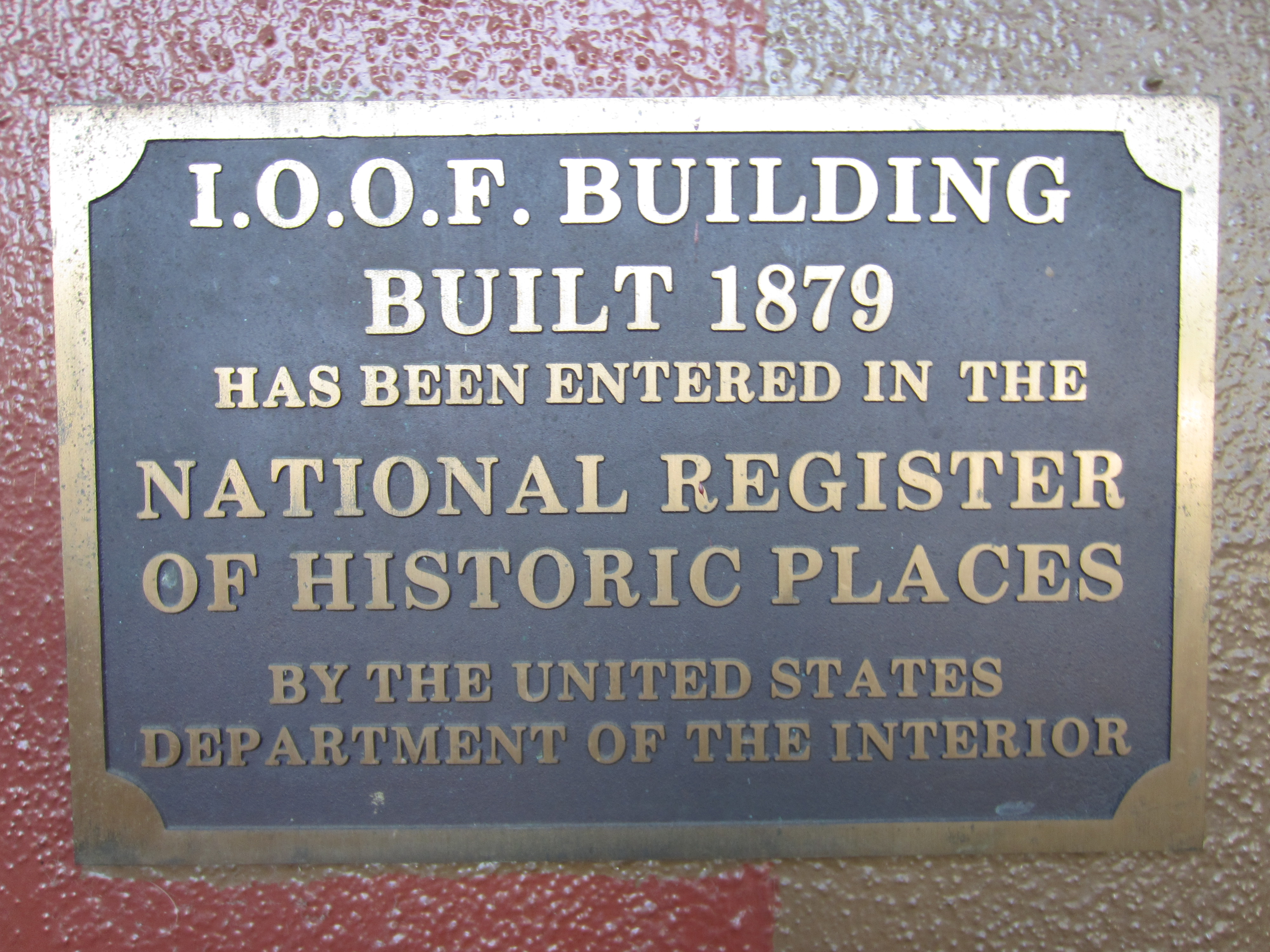
National Register of Historic Places plaque, 2019

The main portion of the building is 60 feet (18 m) by 65 feet (20 m) by 35 feet (11 m). Upstairs about 32 feet (9.8 m) by 60 feet (18 m) was reserved for use by the Oddfellows, and there is a large kitchen and other rooms. The downstairs area is divided into three units and was intended for, and is still used for, retail space. While lower portions of the front façade have been remodeled (including covering bricks by stucco), the upper portion was mostly unchanged from the original, as of 1978, besides having been painted. It had four-over-four lights/windows and has parapets above, with finials that were added at some date after original construction. Photos from c.1890, 1976, and 2011 show upper windows substantially the same; both upper and lower sashes were moveable as of 1978. The sides and rear of the building remained unpainted. Two extensions to the rear had been added. In the lower portion, there originally was an arch (perhaps over the door?) which had a glass spandrel area, which has been filled, and the windows have been changed.

== See also ==
- National Register of Historic Places listings in Jackson County, Oregon
