= Trinity Episcopal Church (Ashland, Oregon) =

Historic church in Oregon, United States

- U.S. National Register of Historic Places
- U.S. Historic district – Contributing property
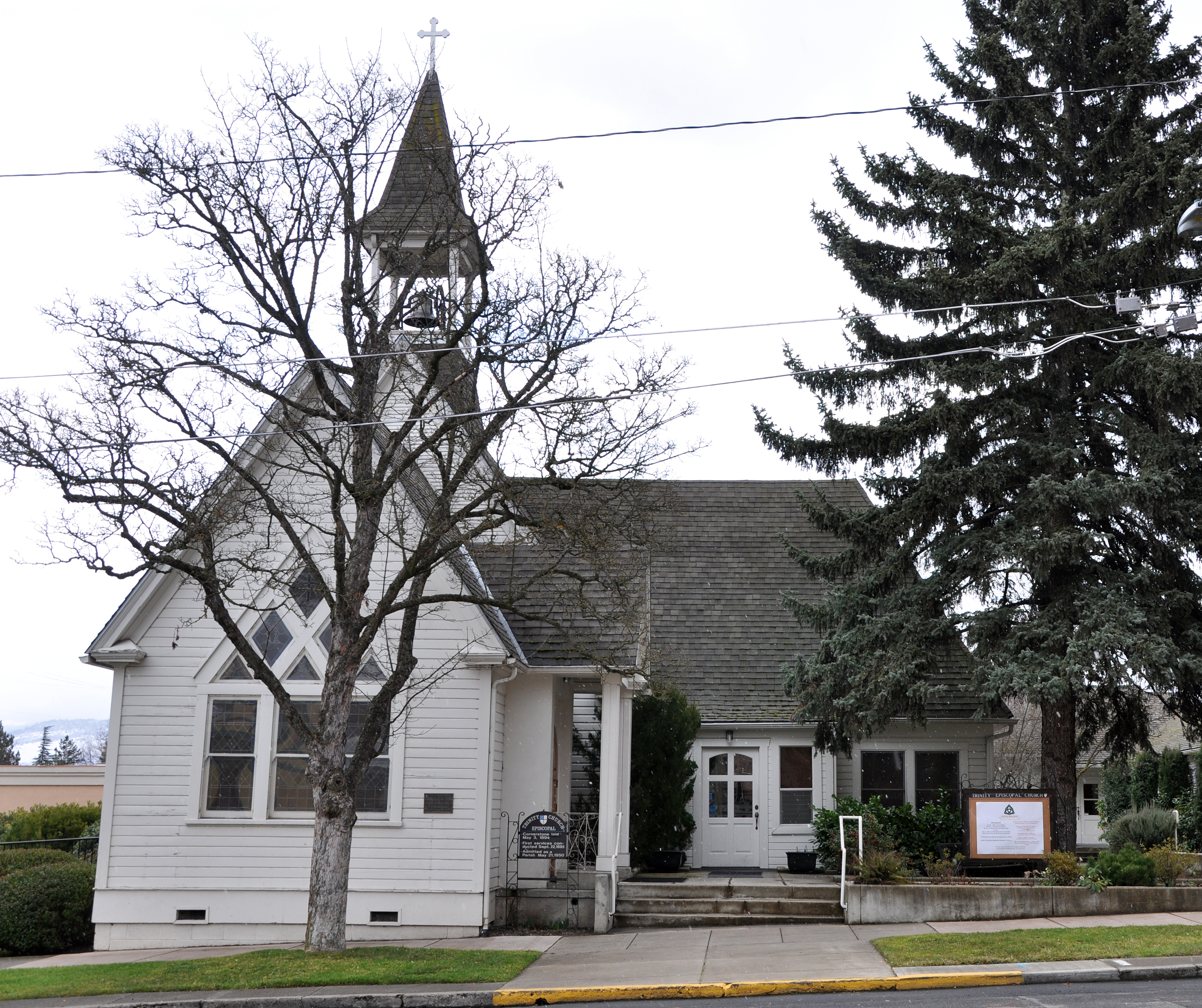
- View from N. 2nd Street
- Location: 44 N. 2nd Street; Ashland, Oregon
- Coordinates: 42°11′45″N 122°42′38″W
- Area: less than one acre
- Built: 1894
- Architect: Schmidt, W. J.
- Architectural style: Gothic Revival
- Part of: Ashland Downtown Historic District (ID00000446)
- NRHP reference No.: 84003015

Significant dates
- Added to NRHP: April 5, 1984
- Designated CP: May 5, 2000

Trinity Episcopal Church is a historic Episcopal church at 44 N. 2nd Street in Ashland, Oregon. It is the oldest church in Ashland. Construction began in 1894 and was completed in 1895. Its design was based on drawings by local builder W. J. Schmidt. Built in the Gothic Revival style, it features a pitched gable roof, a pointed west-facing window, a gabled south-facing porch, and a trussed rafter roof. The church was added to the National Register of Historic Places in 1984.

It was included again on the National Register in 2000 as a contributing building in the Ashland Downtown Historic District.
