= Holly Theatre (Medford, Oregon) =

- U.S. Historic district – Contributing property
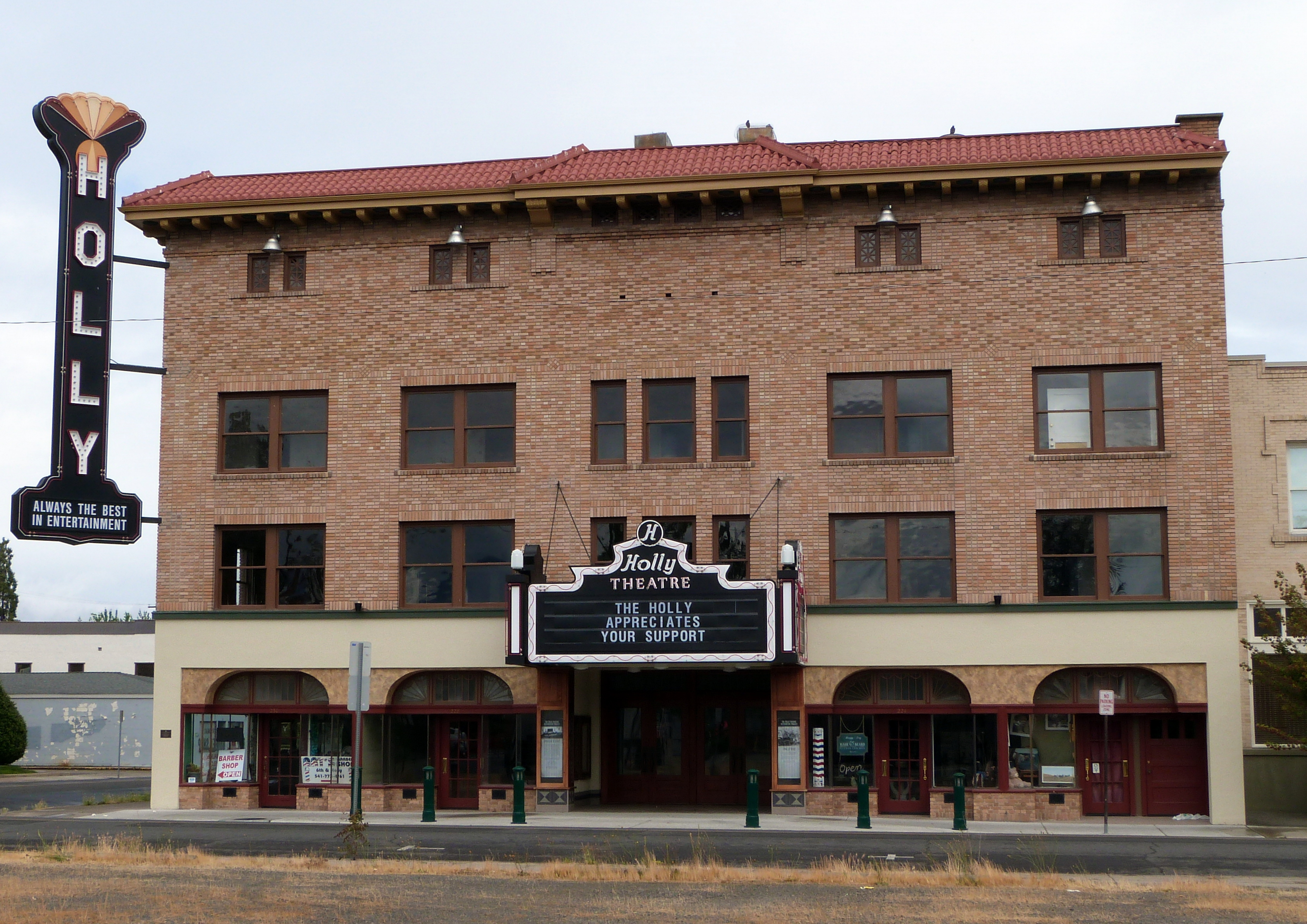
- The theater's exterior in 2013

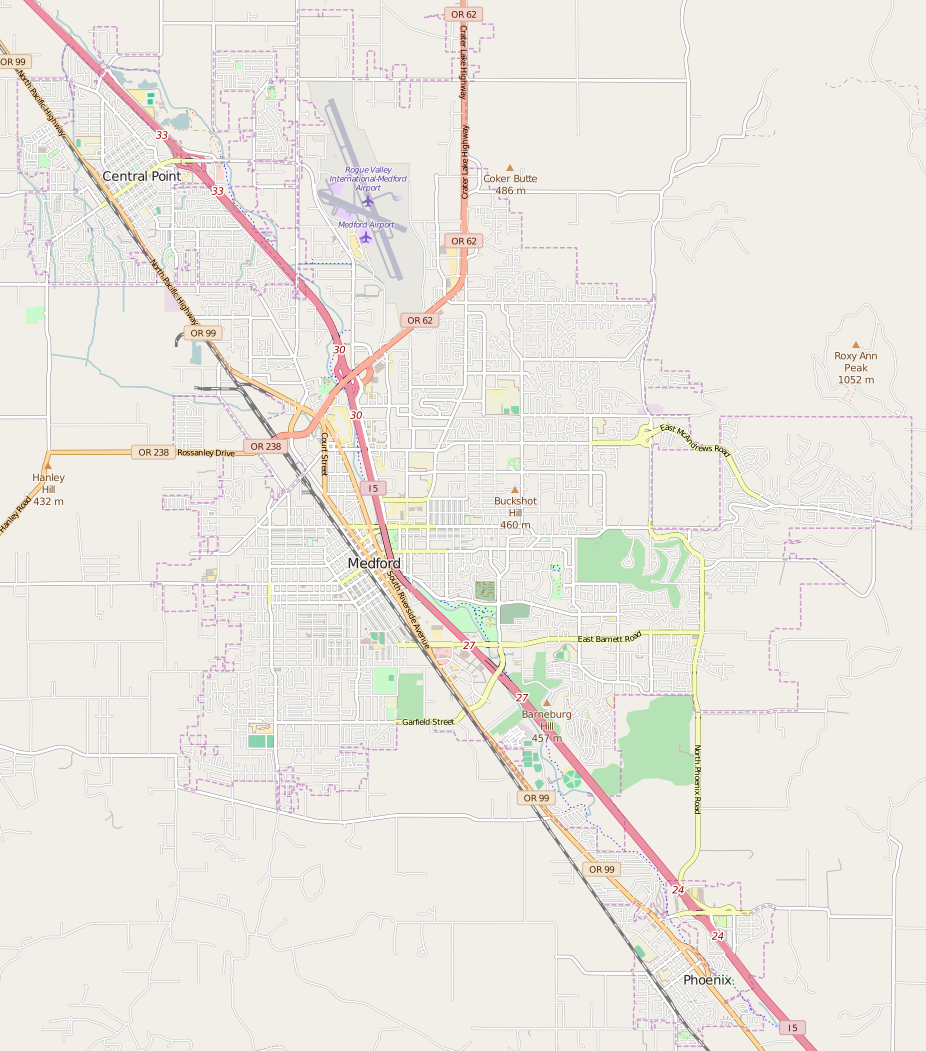
- Location within Medford OR Location within Oregon
- Location: 226 W 6th Street, Medford, Oregon, U.S.
- Coordinates: 42°19′32″N 122°52′35″W
- Built: 1929
- Architect: Frank Chamberlain Clark
- Architectural style: Spanish Colonial Revival
- Part of: Medford Downtown Historic District (ID98000949)
- Added to NRHP: 1998

The Holly Theatre is a historic Spanish Colonial Revival theater in Medford, Jackson County, Oregon, United States.

== History ==
The Holly theater was the second motion picture house to open in Medford. Construction of the building began in 1929, but was halted due to the Great Depression. Construction resumed in March 1930, and was completed later that year. The building was designed by Frank Chamberlain Clark, a southern Oregon-based architect.

Holly Theatre accommodated vaudeville and movies. The 1200-seat theater, large enough to seat ten percent of Medford's population when it was built, continued as a premier venue into the 1970s, but its size was its downfall. The Holly was unable to compete against the smaller, more efficient theaters opening at the time, and it closed in 1986 as did other single-screen, downtown theaters around the country. It was added to the National Register of Historic Places as part of the Medford Downtown Historic District in 1998.

In 2010, the JPR Foundation, a subsidiary of Jefferson Public Radio, purchased the theater with plans to restore it, as they had done with the Cascade Theatre in Redding, California.

== Restoration ==
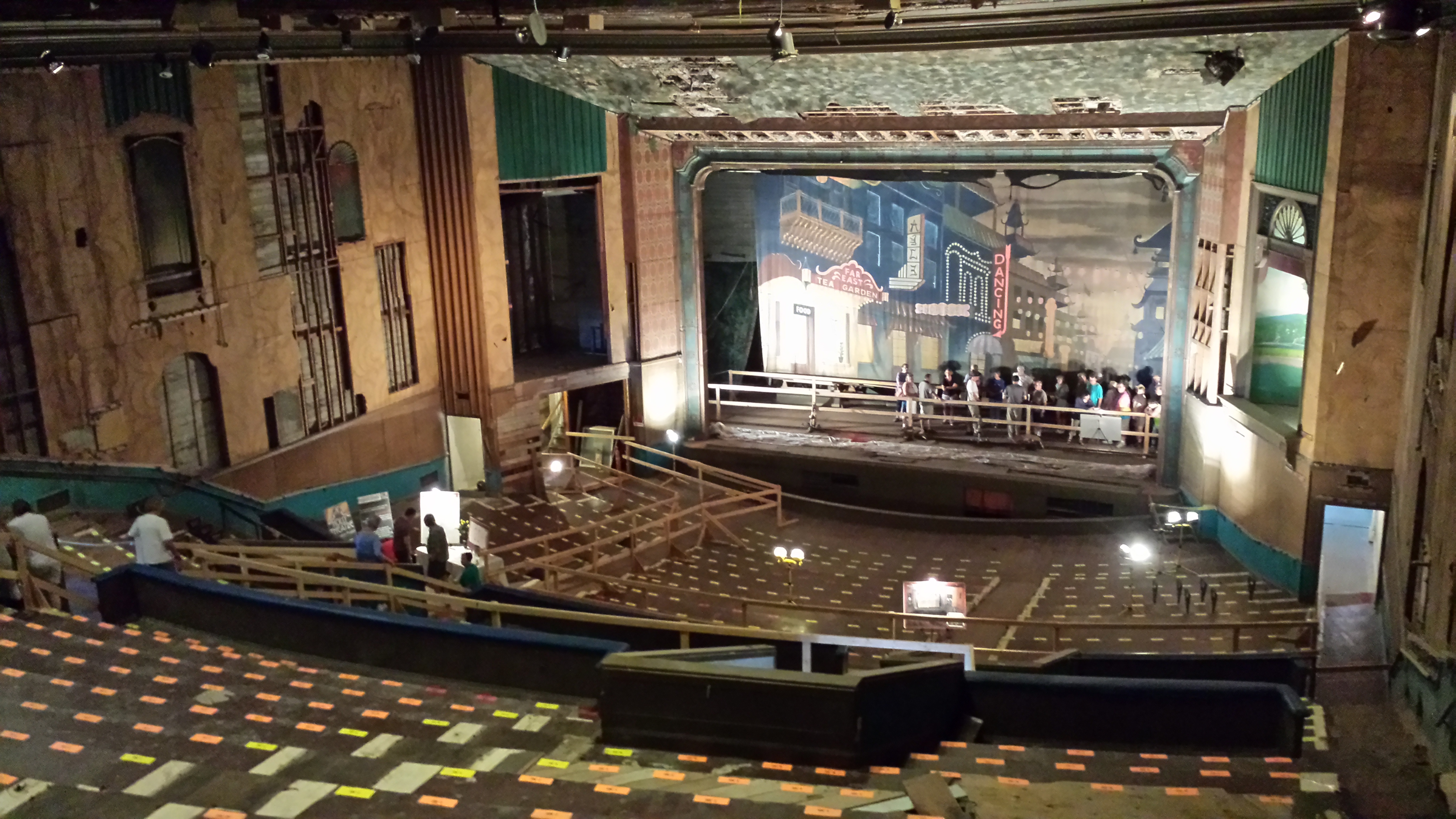
Restoration on the interior of the theater in 2014

In 2011, the JPR Foundation purchased the building and began restoration on it. The restoration was estimated to cost 3.5 million USD. The building had failed ceiling trusses and a leaking roof which were repaired. The façade of the building was restored to its original appearance as it was first built in 1930. A recreated blade sign and marquee with 347 lights and 500 feet of neon was added to the building. A grand relighting ceremony was held on April 21, 2012.

In 2013, the JPR Foundation opened the theater for public tours of its restoration process. The foundation will be offering twice-monthly tours to promote its fund-raising campaign. The interior is currently under construction, exposing beams, stained walls, and faded paint. The public tour includes 144 steps to climb to the top of building. An elevator is not present in the building, but one will be installed as part of the restoration.

Actor Jim Belushi was to perform a benefit concert at EdenVale Winery in the summer of 2015 as a part of the Holly Theatre restoration efforts. "He came and fell in love with the theater", Randy McKay, executive director of Jefferson Live!, told the Mail Tribune. McKay credited Belushi with greatly expanding the donor base for the restoration project and helping to secure and retain state funding. As of November 2018, restoration work was expected to begin very soon, possibly in December. The theatre reopened in 2025.

== See also ==
- National Register of Historic Places listings in Jackson County, Oregon
