= Lithia Springs Hotel =

- Interactive map of the Lithia Springs Hotel area

General information
- Location: Tallapoosa, Georgia, United States
- Coordinates: 33°44′37″N 85°17′16″W
- Construction started: 1891
- Completed: 1892
- Opening: October 15, 1892

Design and construction
- Architect: Ralph L. Spencer

Lithia Springs Hotel was a grand hotel in Tallapoosa, Georgia built by Ralph L. Spencer between 1881 and 1882. It was the largest hotel in the Southeast in the late 19th century to early 20th century. It had 175 rooms, a banquet hall, an elevator, a billiard hall, poolrooms, and a large ballroom. People from all over the country traveled to the Lithia Springs Hotel for health reasons, business, or leisure travel. Many from New York traveled by train for 32 hours. The cost of a roundtrip ticket to Tallapoosa was $38.65. Unfortunately, the economy caused the grand hotel to shut its doors. Several years later the hotel, which was now in ruins, became a fire hazard and had to be dismantled.

Presumably the hotel was named for its lithia water (lithium) springs, as was the town of Lithia Springs, Georgia.

== History ==
In the fall of 1886 as Ralph L. Spencer was traveling by train to the north he envisioned the idea of a grand hotel as he passed by Tallapoosa. Spencer, from Essex, Connecticut, relocated his wife and son to Tallapoosa to follow through with his project. Spencer was described as "above average" in many aspects. He was handsome, personable, wealthy, and a born salesman.

In 1887 Spencer and other contractors obtained charters for the Tallapoosa Water Works Company and the Tallapoosa Electric Light Company. These charters were funded by several of the thriving businesses prior to the construction of the Lithia. Two of these businesses, Tallapoosa Glass Factory and Mountain City Athletic Association, were the main contributors. Both of these companies were vastly expanding and were prominent.

Spencer left town. Many thought he became frustrated with the scale of how large the hotel would be, but they were wrong. He left only to return with Hungarian workers to construct the hotel. The workers settled in a region just southeast of Tallapoosa called "Budapest". This area was named for the Hungarian workers. Once the hotel was complete and everyone started to really settle in, the town started exploding with growth. The wine industry became the primary focus of income for Haralson County and everyone lived lavishly.

After many years of growth for the Lithia Springs Hotel and Tallapoosa area, two events coincided to destroy not only the Grand Lithia Springs Hotel but Tallapoosa. The Georgia Prohibition Act of 1907 caused the main source of income in Tallapoosa to be outlawed. The second was the Great Depression. Both of these events fell on top of one another compounding the issue of funding to uphold the Lithia Springs Hotel. In 1943, the hotel was dismantled because it had become a fire hazard.

== Amenities ==
The Lithia Springs Hotel hosted balls, teas and lawn parties. The garden paths were lined with mimosas and magnolias. Afternoons were spent on the cool, wide verandahs with the delicate scent of wisteria in the air. The Lithia Springs Hotel overlooked a 13-acre (53,000 m^{2}) park with beautiful flowered walk ways, four mineral springs and a beautiful sunset. There were four floors which contained 175 rooms, anything from the banquet hall to pantries. Accommodations also included tennis courts, bowling alleys and riding trails. Dining was of excellence; nine course dinners were served while an orchestra softly played classical music. There were so many amenities that were of royalty, and beyond the 20th century.
