= Teen Musical Theater of Oregon =

American youth theater program

- Teen Musical Theater of Oregon Logo
- Type: Theater Organization
- Founder: John Taylor
- Founding Date: 2005
- Executive Director: Stephen McCandless
- Location: Medford, Oregon
- Theaters Used: Ashland Armory; Southern Oregon University; Crater High School; The Craterian
- Number of Seasons: 20
- Number of Productions: 64 (2 in pre-production)

Teen Musical Theater of Oregon (TMTO) is a youth theater program in Medford, Oregon, US, produced by Craterian Performances.

== Description ==
Teen Musical Theater of Oregon includes kids age 13–19, but will sometimes add children age 9–12, known as Children's Musical Theater of Oregon, depending on the show. Along with children and teens of this age, Teen Musical Theater will sometimes add "Guest Stars" to the shows who take on roles such as Daddy Warbucks in Annie and The Man In Chair from The Drowsy Chaperone. TMTO will generally put on three productions a year—a spring show, a summer show, and a winter show. TMTO will occasionally produce concerts with a smaller, selected cast.

== History ==
Teen Musical Theater began back in 2006 with a spring production of Grease. At that time the production was called Children's Musical Theater of Ashland (CMTA) until it was later renamed Children's Musical Theater of Oregon (CMTO). The company was founded by composer and keyboardist John Taylor and his wife Rhonda Taylor. His inspiration to found this organization came from the impact John P. Healy Jr. had on him when he was a part of San Jose Children's Musical Theater. Shortly after the 2008 summer production of Oklahoma!, Children's Musical Theater of Oregon was adopted by Craterian Performances. During the spring 2010 performance of The Will Rogers Follies, a new branch of Children's Musical Theater of Oregon was created, called Teen Musical Theater of Oregon. While CMTO is still a working entity of the organization, it has taken a back seat allowing TMTO to produce the majority of the Musical Theater of Oregon's productions.

== Original productions ==
The company has made three original productions: Broadway: A Musical Journey, Broadway II: The Journey Continues, and Moving On: TMTO in Concert. The first two being revues of many Broadway songs from many different Broadway shows including Lion King, Damn Yankees, A Chorus Line, The Color Purple and Hairspray. The Broadway series was created as a collaboration between John Taylor and David McCandless. Moving On was created and directed by Cailey McCandless and was a sendoff concert for eight graduating seniors who had participated in TMTO for years.

== List of Full Productions ==
2006 Season

- Grease
- The Wizard of Oz

2007

- High School Musical
- Peter Pan

2008

- Broadway: A Musical Journey
- Oklahoma!

2009

- Broadway 2: The Journey Continues
- Once on This Island

2010

- The Will Rogers Follies
- Seussical

2011

- Hello, Dolly!
- Joseph and the Amazing Technicolor Dreamcoat
- You're A Good Man, Charlie Brown

2012

- Pippin
- The Music Man
- Miracle on 34th Street

2013

- The Drowsy Chaperone
- Tarzan
- Moving On: TMTO in Concert
- Annie

2014

- Thoroughly Modern Millie
- Shrek the Musical
- A Christmas Carol

2015

- Bye Bye Birdie
- Peter Pan
- White Christmas

2016

- How to Succeed in Business Without Really Trying
- The Little Mermaid
- The Addams Family

2017

- The Will Rogers Follies
- The Lion King Jr.
- Hairspray
- Seussical

2018

- Once Upon a Mattress
- Aladdin Jr.
- Joseph and the Amazing Technicolor Dreamcoat
- Willy Wonka

2019

- Newsies
- Freaky Friday
- Pinocchio Jr.
- Howlin' Halloween
- Frozen Jr.

2020

- Children of Eden
- The Twelve Days of Christmas Countdown

2021

- Into the Woods
- High School Musical
- The Twelve Days of Christmas Countdown

2022

- Drowsy Chaperone
- Beauty and the Beast
- Cinderella

2023

- Shrek
- Finding Nemo Jr.
- Footloose
- Music Man

2024

- The Little Mermaid
- How to Succeed in Business Without Really Trying
- Howlin' Halloween
- Alice in Wonderland

2025

- Hadestown
- Tarzan
- A Christmas Carol

2026

- Freaky Friday
- James And The Giant Peach
- Frozen
