= First Baptist Church (Ashland, Oregon) =

Historic church in Oregon, United States

- U.S. National Register of Historic Places
- U.S. Historic district – Contributing property
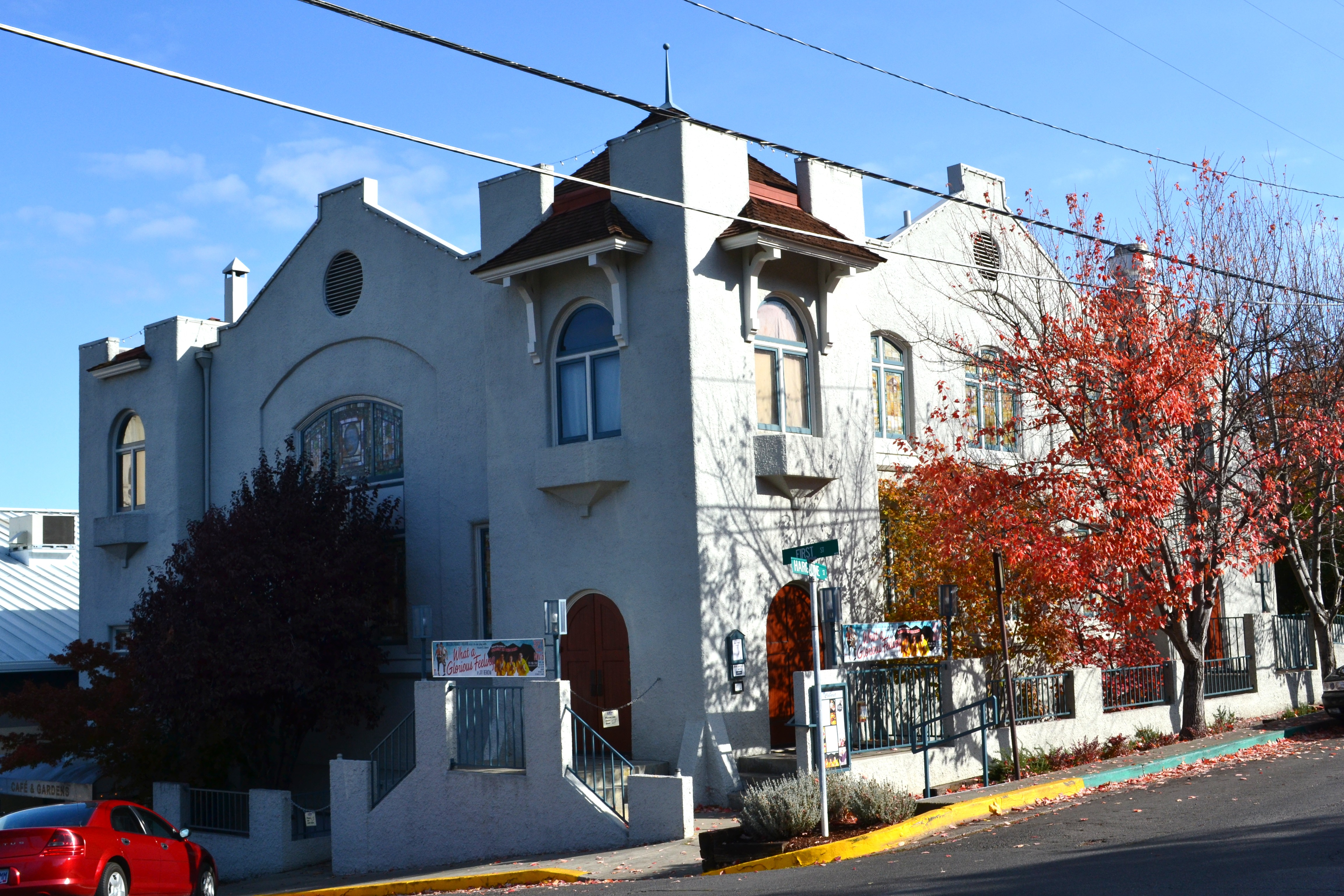
- The First Baptist Church in 2011.
- Location: 241 Hargadine Street; Ashland, Oregon
- Coordinates: 42°11′42″N 122°42′46″W
- Area: less than one acre
- Built: 1911
- Architect: Frank C. Clark
- Architectural style: Mission/Spanish revival
- Part of: Ashland Downtown Historic District (ID00000446)
- NRHP reference No.: 79002066
- Added to NRHP: March 28, 1979

First Baptist Church is a historic church at 241 Hargadine Street in Ashland, Oregon.

It was built in 1911 and added to the National Register in 1979.

Ashland's First Baptist Church was sold in the late 1960s. Over the next fifteen years and multiple owners the building remained vacant and deteriorated through vandalism. It was, at one point, painted bright pink, creating a landmark known locally as "the Old Pink Church." In 1982 the boarded-up building was purchased by Craig Hudson to create the Oregon Cabaret Theatre, restoring the structure to its 1911 appearance, including replication of many of the stained glass windows.
