= Ashland Springs Hotel =

- Lithia Springs Hotel
- U.S. National Register of Historic Places
- U.S. Historic district – Contributing property
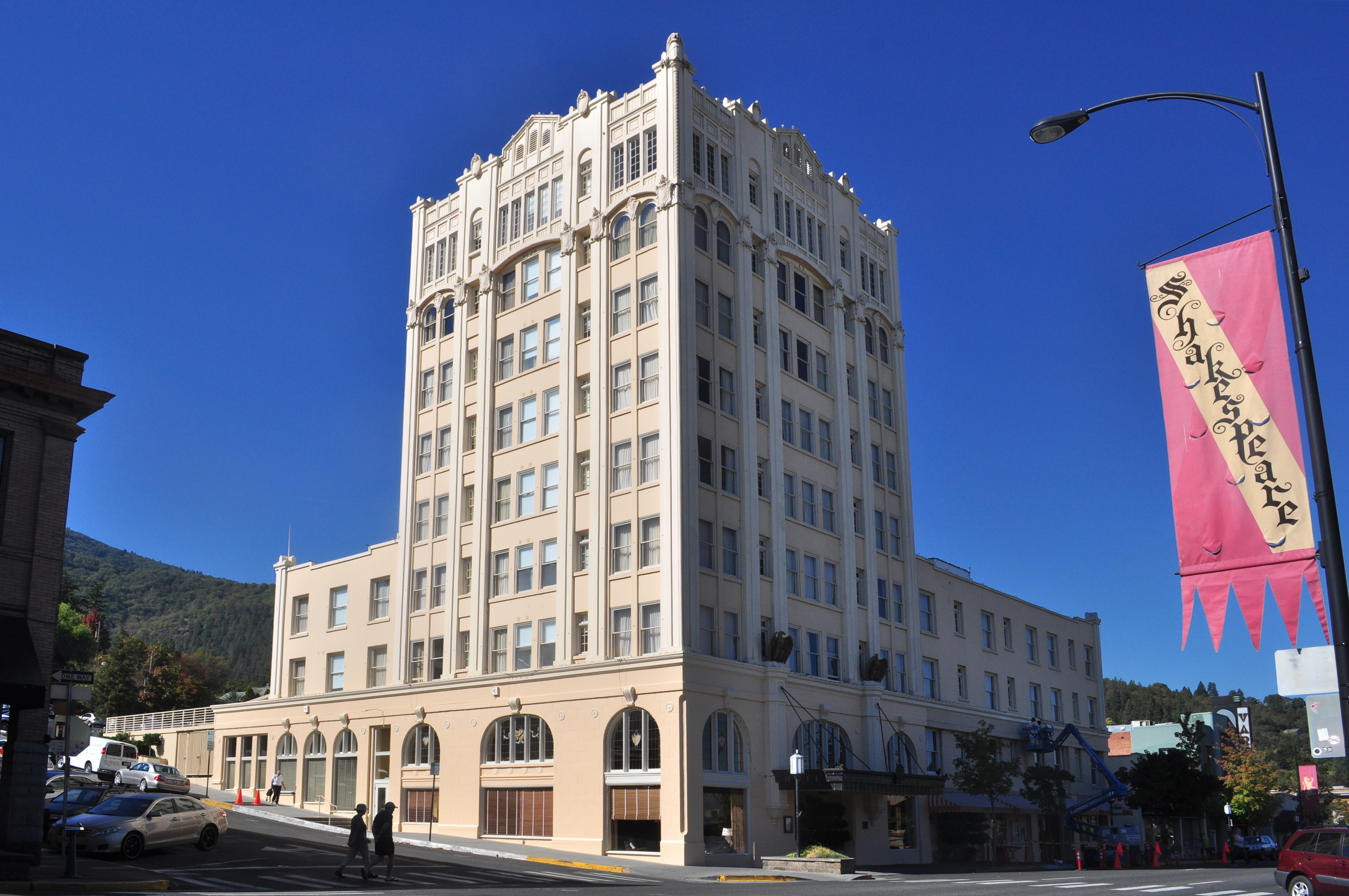
- The Lithia Springs Hotel (renamed as Ashland Springs Hotel) in 2016
- Location: 212 E. Main Street; Ashland, Oregon
- Coordinates: 42°11′45″N 122°42′46″W
- Area: 1.9 acres (0.77 ha)
- Built: 1925
- Architect: Tourtellotte & Hummel
- Architectural style: Art Deco
- Part of: Ashland Downtown Historic District (ID00000446)
- NRHP reference No.: 78002289

Significant dates
- Added to NRHP: March 14, 1978
- Designated CP: May 5, 2000

The Ashland Springs Hotel is a historic hotel in Ashland, Oregon, United States. Built in 1925, it was formerly known as the Mark Antony Motor Hotel or the Lithia Springs Hotel. It was listed on the National Register of Historic Places in 1978 as "Lithia Springs Hotel". It was listed again on the National Register in 2000 as a contributing building in Ashland Downtown Historic District. In 2022 the hotel is also a member of Historic Hotels of America, an official program of the National Trust for Historic Preservation.

The Ashland Springs Hotel is a member of Historic Hotels of America, the official program of the National Trust for Historic Preservation. The hotel was built before the Great Depression, originally as the Litha Springs Hotel. It was built as a first-class hotel to draw visitors to the area, designed by the architectural firm Tourtellotte & Hummel with reinforced concrete with architectural elements that reflected a Romanesque, Gothic, and Neo-Classical Revival style. It was planned to be the tallest building between Portland and San Francisco. The design of the hotel was similar to that of the Boise Hotel and the Baker Hotel, featuring a nine-story central tower with two short wings.

In 1961, the hotel was renamed to the Mark Antony Motor Hotel. Due to economic issues, the owner undertook an extensive restoration of the hotel under the National Park Service's Certified Rehabilitation program for which the owners received a preservation tax credit.

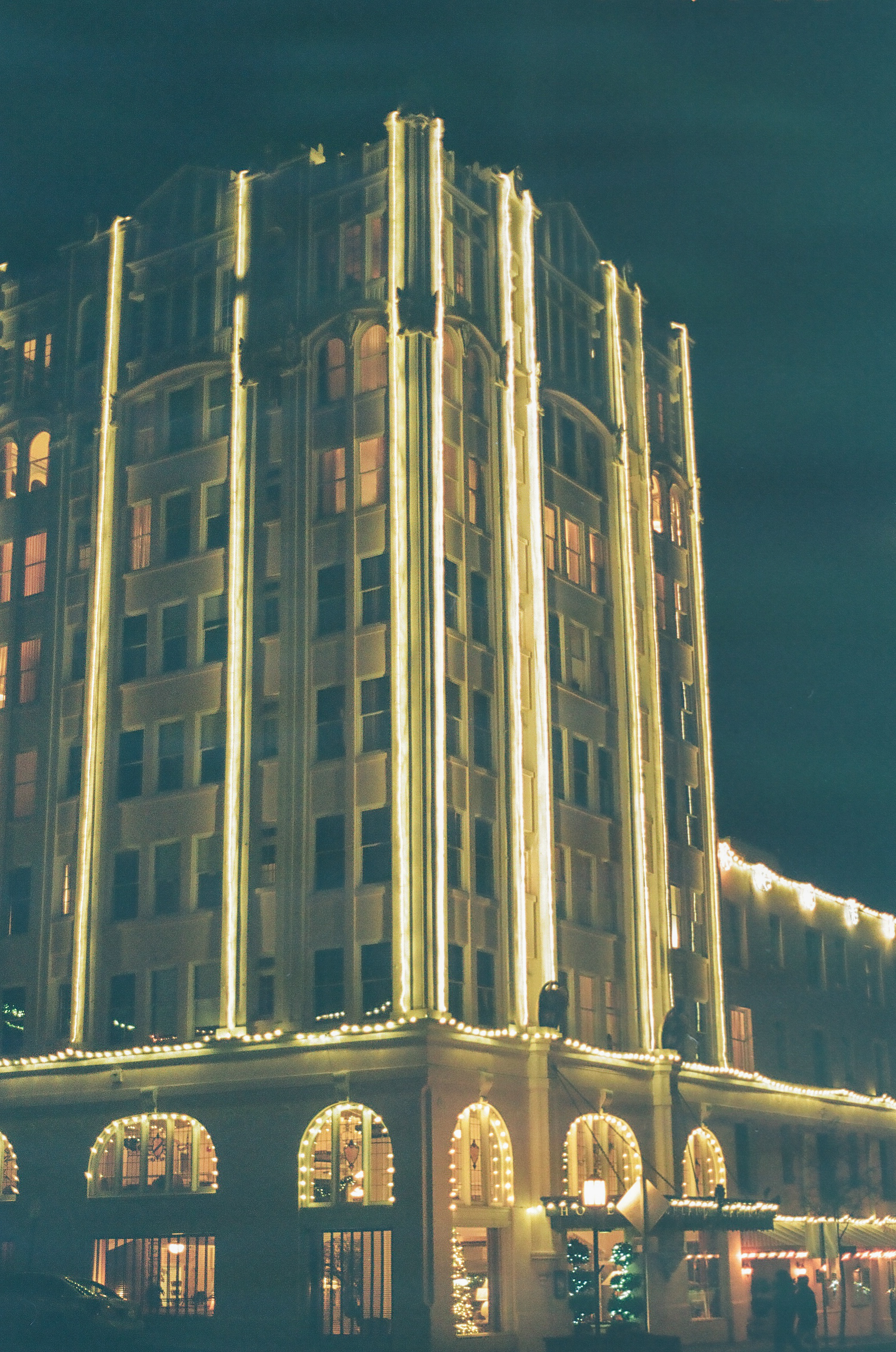
Ashland Springs Hotel at night, with winter lights.
