= Ecology of the San Francisco Estuary =

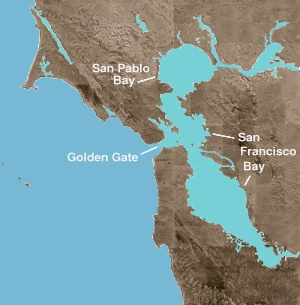
San Francisco Estuary

The San Francisco Estuary together with the Sacramento–San Joaquin River Delta represents a highly altered ecosystem. The region has been heavily re-engineered to accommodate the needs of water delivery, shipping, agriculture, and most recently, suburban development. These needs have wrought direct changes in the movement of water and the nature of the landscape, and indirect changes from the introduction of non-native species. New species have altered the architecture of the food web as surely as levees have altered the landscape of islands and channels that form the complex system known as the Delta.

This article deals particularly with the ecology of the low salinity zone (LSZ) of the estuary. Reconstructing a historic food web for the LSZ is difficult for a number of reasons. First, there is no clear record of the species that historically have occupied the estuary. Second, the San Francisco Estuary and Delta have been in geologic and hydrologic transition for most of their 10,000 year history, and so describing the "natural" condition of the estuary is much like "hitting a moving target". Climate change, hydrologic engineering, shifting water needs, and newly introduced species will continue to alter the food web configuration of the estuary. This model provides a snapshot of the current state, with notes about recent changes or species introductions that have altered the configuration of the food web. Understanding the dynamics of the current food web may prove useful for restoration efforts to improve the functioning and species diversity of the estuary.

== Physical geography ==
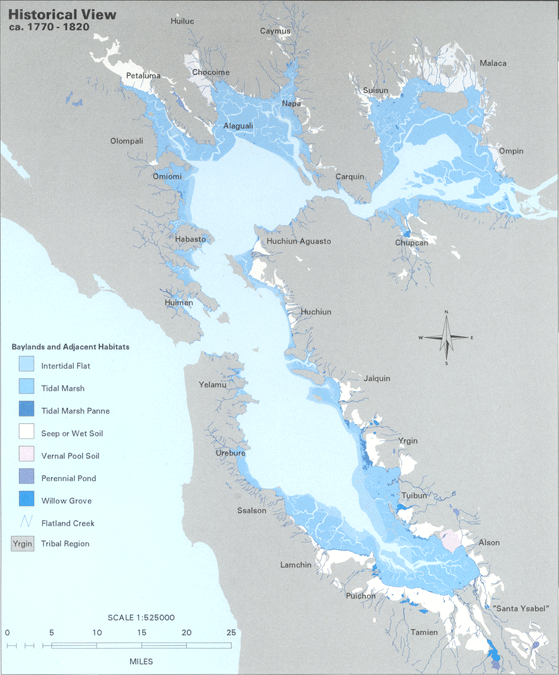
San Francisco Estuary c. 1770-1820

The San Francisco Bay is both a bay and an estuary. The former term refers to any inlet or cove providing a physical refuge from the open ocean. An estuary is any physiographic feature where freshwater meets an ocean or sea. The northern portion of the bay is a brackish estuary, consisting of a number of physical embayments which are dominated by both marine and fresh water fluxes. These geographic entities are, moving from saline to fresh (or west to east): San Pablo Bay, immediately north of the Central Bay; the Carquinez Strait, a narrow, deep channel leading to Suisun Bay; and the Delta of the Sacramento and San Joaquin rivers.

Until the 20th century, the LSZ of the estuary was fringed by tule-dominated freshwater wetlands. Between 80 and 95% of these historic wetlands have been filled to facilitate land use and development around the Bay Area. Habitat loss at the edges of the pelagic zone is thought to create a loss of native pelagic fish species, by increasing vulnerability to predation.

The intertidal and benthic estuary is presently dominated by mudflats that are largely the result of sedimentation derived from gold mining in the Sierra Nevada in the late 19th century. The trend toward high sediment loads was reversed in the 1950s with the advent of the Central Valley Project, locking up most sediment behind dams, and resulting in an annual net loss of sediments from the estuary. Thus the mudflats appear to be slowly receding, although turbidity remains extremely high. The high turbidity of the water is responsible for the unique condition that exists in the San Francisco Estuary wherein high nutrient availability does not lead to high phytoplankton production. Instead, most algae photosynthetic organisms are light-limited.

The Delta has likewise experienced heavy alteration. Beginning in the 19th century, naturally occurring levees were reinforced for permanency, to protect farmlands from regular flooding. Many of these farms were established on peat islands occurring in the middle of the Delta waterways. Intensive farming oxidized the high carbon content of the soil, causing considerable loss of soil mass. As a consequence, these islands have subsided, or sunk, to nearly 6 meters below sea level. The Delta today consists of highly riprapped waterways, punctuated by islands that appear like "floating bowls" with their basins far below the surface of the water. These islands are at high risk for flooding due to levee collapse. The subsequent eastward shift in salinity is expected to dramatically alter the ecology of the entire LSZ of the San Francisco Estuary.

== Hydrodynamics ==
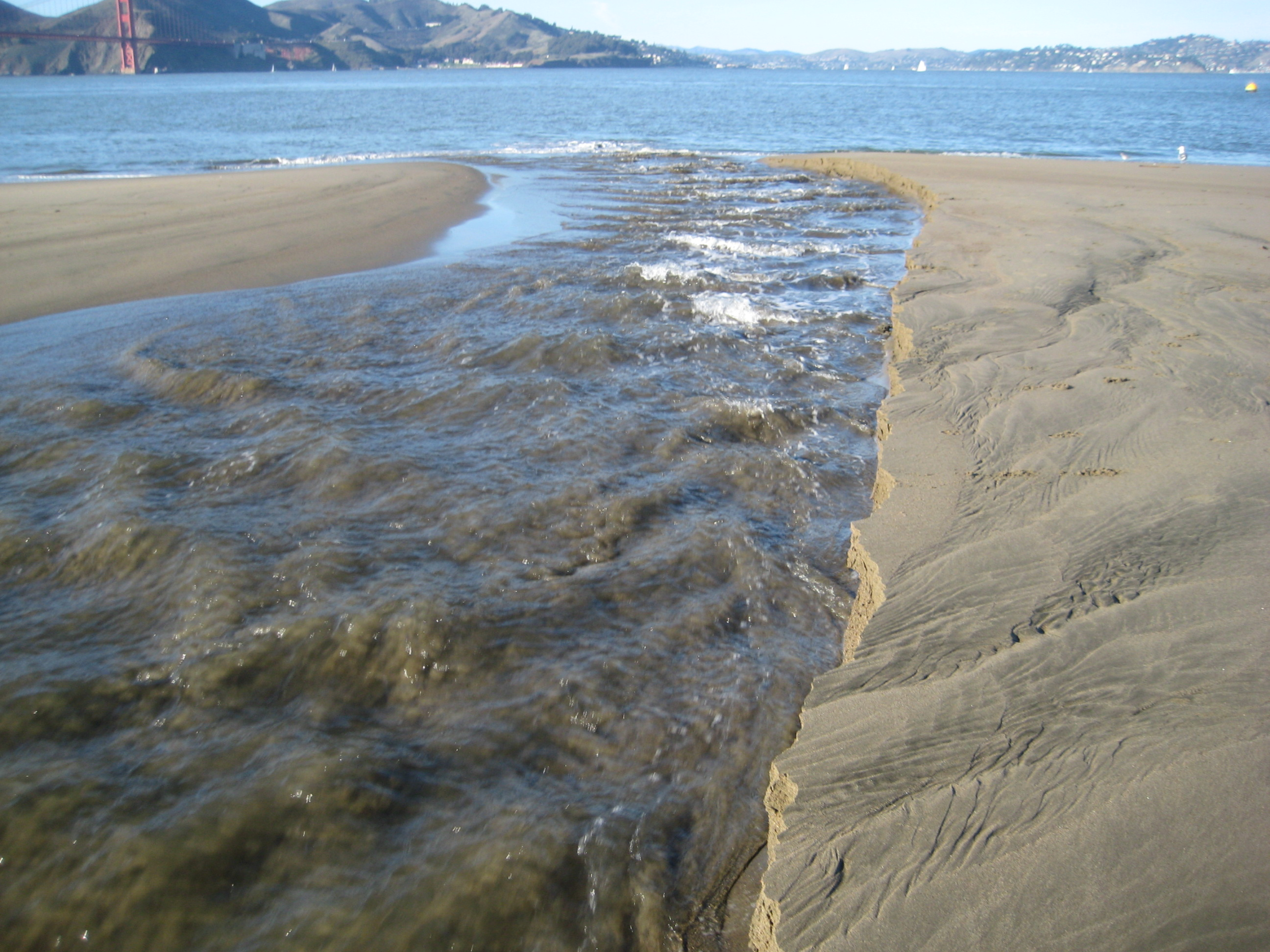
Freshwater stream feeding into the San Francisco Estuary

The LSZ centers around 2 psu (practical salinity units, a measurement of salinity) and ranges from about 6 psu down to 0.5 psu. The primary fresh water inputs to the estuary derive from runoff of regional precipitation, the Sacramento River, and the San Joaquin River.

River inflow is largely controlled by upstream reservoir releases. A significant fraction of this inflow is exported out of the Delta by the federal Central Valley Project and the State Water Project to southern California for agricultural and urban use. These alterations have removed much of the variation in through-estuary outflow (i. e., freshwater that makes it out the Golden Gate), creating lower outflow in the winter and higher outflow in the summer than historically found in the estuary. On average, freshwater flows into the estuary are 50% of historic flows. Phytoplankton, zooplankton, and larval and adult fish can become entrained in the export pumps, causing a potentially significant but unknown impact on the abundance of these organisms. This may be particularly true of the endangered delta smelt, a small endemic fish; unexceptional except that it has been described as being tremendously abundant in historical accounts. The delta smelt is believed to migrate and spawn upstream in the Delta during the early summer, placing its eggs and larvae at high risk for entrainment. Management for the smelt is currently the source of controversy as its ecology brings into collision course the disparate water needs of conservation, development and agriculture in California.

The movement of water out of the estuary is complex and dependent upon a number of factors. Tidal cycles cause water to move toward and away from the Golden Gate four times in a 24-hour period.

Using 2 psu as a marker for the Low Salinity Zone, the direction and magnitude of fluctuations can be tracked as its distance in kilometers from the Golden Gate, or X2. Because the position of X2 relies upon a number of physical parameters including inflow, export, and tides, its position shifts over many kilometers on a daily and seasonal cycle; over the course of a year, it can range from San Pablo Bay during high flow periods, up into the Delta during the summer drought. The position of X2 is carefully monitored and maintained by releasing water from upstream reservoirs in anticipation of export demand. This is mandated by State Water Board Decision 1641 and requires that state and federal pumping be curtailed if X2 is shifted east of Chipps Island (75 river kilometers upstream of the Golden Gate Bridge) during the months of February through May, or east of Collinsville (81 river kilometers upstream of the Golden Gate Bridge) during the months of January, June, July and August. (D-1641 pp 150)

Gravitational circulation causes stratified high salinity water at depth to flow landward while low salinity water on top flows seaward. The effect of gravitational circulation may be most pronounced during periods of high fresh water flow, providing a negative feedback for maintaining the salt field and the distribution of pelagic organisms in the estuary.

Mixing is important at the landward edge of gravitational circulation, often around X2, where the water column becomes less stratified. A fixed mixing zone occurs at the "Benicia Bump" at the east end of the Carquinez Strait, where the deep channel becomes dramatically shallower as it enters Suisun Bay. Mixing is critical in maintaining salinity such that extremely large inputs of fresh water are required to move X2 a short distance to the west. Mixing also assists pelagic organisms in maintaining position in the estuary, slowing the advection of primary and secondary production out of the system.

== Pelagic zone ==
Pelagic organisms spend all or part of their lives in the open water, where habitat is defined not by edges but by physiological tolerance to salinity and temperature. The Low Salinity Zone (LSZ) of the San Francisco Estuary constitutes a habitat for a suite of organisms that are specialized to survive in this unique confluence of terrestrial, freshwater, and marine influences. While there are many habitats with distinct ecologies that are part of the estuary (including marine, freshwater, intertidal marsh and benthic mudflat systems) each is linked to the LSZ by export and import of freshwater, nutrients, carbon, and organisms.

The distribution and abundance of organisms in the LSZ is dependent upon both abiotic and biotic factors. Abiotic factors include the physical geography and hydrology of the estuary, including nutrient inputs, sediment load, turbidity, environmental stochasticity, climate and anthropogenic influences. Abiotic factors tend to drive production in the estuarine environment, and are mediated by biotic factors.

Biotic factors include nutrient uptake and primary production, secondary production of zooplankton, food web and trophic dynamics, energetic transfer, advection and dispersal in and out of the system, survival and mortality, predation, and competition from introduced species.

== Food web ==
It is difficult to characterize the historic food web of the San Francisco Estuary because of the dramatic changes in geography, hydrology, and species composition that have occurred in the past century. However, monitoring begun in the 1970s gives some information about the historic dynamics of the foodweb. Prior to the 1980s the LSZ was dominated by a phytoplankton-driven foodweb, a stable mesoplankton population dominated by the copepod Eurytemora affinis, and large macrozooplankton typified by San Francisco bay shrimp and mysid shrimps. These provided nutrition and energy to native filter feeders such as the northern anchovy (Engraulis mordax), and planktivores such as delta smelt and juvenile salmon.

Food web change has been driven historically by increased turbidity, and more recently by introduced species, as described in the sections on primary and secondary production.

Notably, the high clearance rate of the introduced Amur River clam Potamocorbula amurensis population has produced a ten-fold decline in plankton density, resulting in a carbon trap in the benthos and an assumed increase in waste detrital production. This waste is hypothesized to fuel the microbial loop, resulting in an increase in microzooplankton such as the copepod Limnoithona tetraspina, which utilize rotifers and ciliates.

These changes are one cause for declining fish stocks. For example, the northern anchovy, Engraulis mordax, was until the 1980s quite abundant in the Low Salinity Zone, until its range in the estuary became restricted to the Central and South Bays. This is probably due to a behavioral response following the introduction of the Amur River (Potamocorbula amurensis) clam and the subsequent decline in plankton availability.

More recently, a general pelagic organism decline (POD) was described, and this has been the source of much concern within the scientific, managerial, and political communities.

Several key species, including delta smelt, longfin smelt, striped bass, and threadfin shad have been declared "species of interest" because of a stepwise decline in abundance beginning in 2001. This was attended by a similar decline in secondary productivity and is currently the source of much research. A number of hypotheses have been proposed to explain the POD, including food web decline, water exports from the Delta, and toxics from urban, industrial, or agricultural sources.

== Producers ==
=== Primary production and nutrient uptake ===
Primary production by phytoplankton fixes energy and key nutrients into a biologically available form (i.e., food), via photosynthesis. Phytoplankton production is largely structured by physical parameters: nutrient availability, sunlight, turbidity, and temperature.

The San Francisco Estuary has a numerous sources of nutrients that can be used for primary production, derived largely from waste water treatment facilities, agricultural and urban drainage, and the ocean. In spite of this, the estuary is unique in that it tends to have a relatively depressed rate of primary production. This is probably due to two factors: large inputs of nitrogen in the form of ammonium, which suppresses nitrate uptake by phytoplankton, which prefer the metabolically cheaper NH_{4}+, and high turbidity, which limits light required for photosynthesis to the top few centimeters of the water column. This turbidity is a legacy of hydraulic gold mining in the Sierra Nevada in the 1850s.

High residence time of water in the estuary tends to allow phytoplankton biomass to accumulate, increasing density, while low residence time removes phytoplankton from the estuary. The latter is typical of the main channels of the estuary during periods of high flow, when surface waters tend to flush particles and plankton downstream.

Herbivory also removes phytoplankton from the water column. While the pelagic food web is based upon phytoplankton production, most of this production is diverted to the benthos via predation by the introduced Amur River clam (Corbula amurensis). Levels of phytoplankton biomass declined by an order of magnitude after the widespread introduction of C. amurensis in the mid-1980s, and have not rebounded.

=== Photosynthetic production ===
The main source of photosynthetically derived energy is phytoplankton. Generally speaking, diatoms and microflagellates produce most of the bioavailable carbon in the estuary. Other types, notably the dinoflagellates, may produce harmful algal blooms, or red tides, that are less readily available for assimilation into the foodweb.

Primary production from phytoplankton is a function of two different factors: growth rates and accumulation (Fig. 1). Although the LSZ is a sink for high concentrations of nutrients from urban and agricultural sources, phytoplankton production rates are quite low. Nitrate is optimally used by phytoplankton for growth, but ammonium (largely derived from sewage outfalls) has a suppressive effect on growth rate. Thus, while not nutrient-limited, phytoplankton tend to grow more slowly due to the kinds of nitrogen present. Another suppressive factor on growth rate is the high turbidity of the estuary, which limits the ability of photosynthetically active radiation (PAR) to penetrate beyond the top few centimeters of the water column. This limits phytoplankton photosynthesis to a relatively shallow photic zone. Thus, when the water column is stratified, turbidity is high, and ammonium is present, the growth rate of phytoplankton is typically suppressed.

Phytoplankton accumulation is primarily the result of residence time. The north Delta and Suisun Bay have relatively low residence times due to the high volume of water moving through the region for downstream flow and for export to southern California. Since water moves more rapidly through this part of the system, the rate of accumulation decreases as productivity is advected out of the system. In contrast, parts of the southern Delta have a higher residence time due to the low volume of water moving through the system; in fact the water on occasion runs backwards, due to the lack of inflow from the San Joaquin River, and export pumping. During summer, phytoplankton density may be an order of magnitude higher here than in other parts of the estuary.

Harmful algal blooms (HAB's) of dinoflagellates or cyanobacteria produce toxic metabolic byproducts that render them noxious to many organisms. Fostered by a combination of high nutrient concentrations and temperatures, HAB's have a doubly negative effect on the food web by competitively excluding diatoms and microflagellates, further reducing bioavailable primary production. While certain invertebrates such as bivalves may not be directly affected, they may propagate toxins up the food chain, sickening or killing predators. It is not well understood how copepods are affected. The invasive algae Microcystis aeruginosa is now common in the Delta during summer months and may reduce copepod productivity (in addition to being potentially carcinogenic for humans).

=== Detrital production ===
Enormous quantities of sediment and detritus flux through the LSZ. Much of this is organic debris in the form of dissolved and particulate organic matter (DOM and POM, respectively). In addition to upstream sources, organic matter may accumulate from local organism mortality and waste production.

Detritivores capitalize upon this energy source, creating an alternate and parallel food web of potentially large importance. This is because carbon fixation into the detrital food web is not limited by stratification, turbidity or day length, all of which limit photosynthesis. Detrital production occurs continuously, limited only by inputs and advection out of the Delta system.

Bacteria are the chief agents of transformation of DOM and POM into bioavailable carbon through the microbial loop. This mechanism is particularly important in nutrient limited marine systems, where bacteria release nutrients from sinking detritus, allowing it to be recycled back to the photic zone. Little work has been applied to the function of the microbial loop in the San Francisco Estuary, but it may be that the role of bacteria is not critical for recycling nutrients in a eutrophic system. Rather, they may provide an alternative food chain through direct grazing by flagellates, rotifers and ciliates.

The high abundance of the cyclopoid copepod Limnoithona tetraspina may be due to its reliance on ciliates rather than phytoplankton as a primary food source. The major species of calanoid copepods may also use ciliates as a supplementary or even primary food source, but to what degree is unknown.

=== Secondary production ===
Secondary production refers to organisms that feed on primary production and transfer energy to higher trophic levels of the estuarine foodweb. Historically, secondary production in the San Francisco Estuary was dominated by mysid shrimp production. However, the native mysid Neomysis mercedis has been largely replaced by the introduced Acanthomysis bowmani, which persists at lower densities. The introduced amphipod Gammurus daiberi may have taken over some of this niche, but it is largely restricted to fresh water.

Today, the main source of secondary production derives from copepods. The naturalized native calanoid copepod Eurytemora affinis is believed to have been introduced near the end of 19th century. It dominated the zooplankton of the low salinity zone until the 1980s when it was largely replaced by another introduced calanoid copepod, Pseudodiaptomus forbesi. P. forbesi persists by maintaining a source population in freshwater, high-residence regions of the estuary, particularly in the Delta, outside the range of salinity tolerance of the Amur River clam. Because the once-dominant E. affinis lacks an upstream range, it is more vulnerable to predation by the clam, and suffers from apparent competition with P. forbesi.

Other calanoid copepods that may be of significance are the recently introduced Sinocalanus doerri and Acartiella sinensis. Little is known about the life histories of these organisms, although based upon their morphology, they may prey on other copepods. They appear in irregular cycles of abundance, during which they may dominate the zooplankton.

Yet another invasive copepod, the very small cyclopoid Limnoithona tetraspina, appeared in the Low Salinity Zone in the 1990s. Since then, L. tetraspina has become the numerically dominant copepod, reaching densities on the order of 10,000/m3. It relies on the microbial loop as its food source, feeding upon bacteria, ciliates and rotifers. In addition, it seems invulnerable to predation by the Amur River clam, for reasons that are unknown. Because of its small size, L. tetraspina is generally not available for consumption by larger predators, particularly fish, making it an energetic dead end.

== Consumers ==
=== Primary consumers ===
Primary consumers rely upon primary production as a main food source. The most important consumers of the pelagic web of the LSZ are copepods, along with the rotifers, flagellates and ciliates mentioned above. All species of calanoid copepods have declined under high predation pressure from the recently introduced Amur River clam (Corbula amurensis). Because of this, and because copepods rely upon both photosynthetic and detrital food sources, copepods in the LSZ have limited feedback on primary production, unlike marine and lentic systems where copepods can graze down blooms in a matter of days.

Pseudodiaptomus forbesi is the dominant calanoid copepod of the LSZ in terms of biomass. It has a sufficiently wide salinity tolerance that it can persist both at low salinity and in fresh water. This wide distribution helps the population maintain an upstream refuge from predation, unlike other species with narrower salinity tolerances.

Limnoithona tetraspina has become the numerically dominant cyclopoid copepod since its introduction in 1993. It feeds primarily upon ciliates and microflagellates, but unlike P. forbesi, it is relatively impervious to predation by clams or fish, hence its abundance. Energetically, L. tetraspina may be a dead end for the food web; these copepods are either advected out of the system by tides and currents, or die and fall down to the benthos, where they may be available to the microbial loop, or to detritivores.

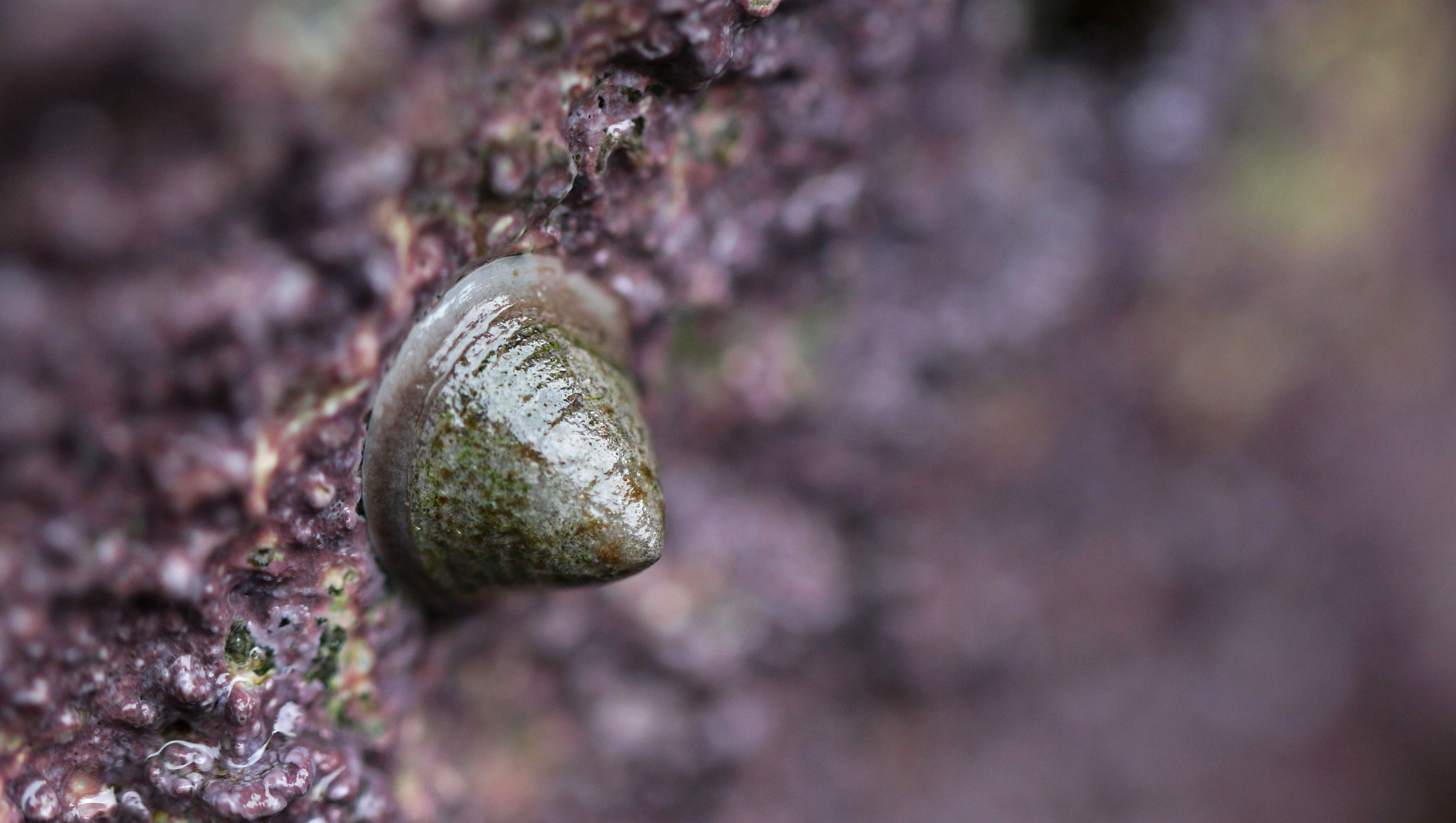
Shield limpet (Lottia pelta) found in central and south SF bay

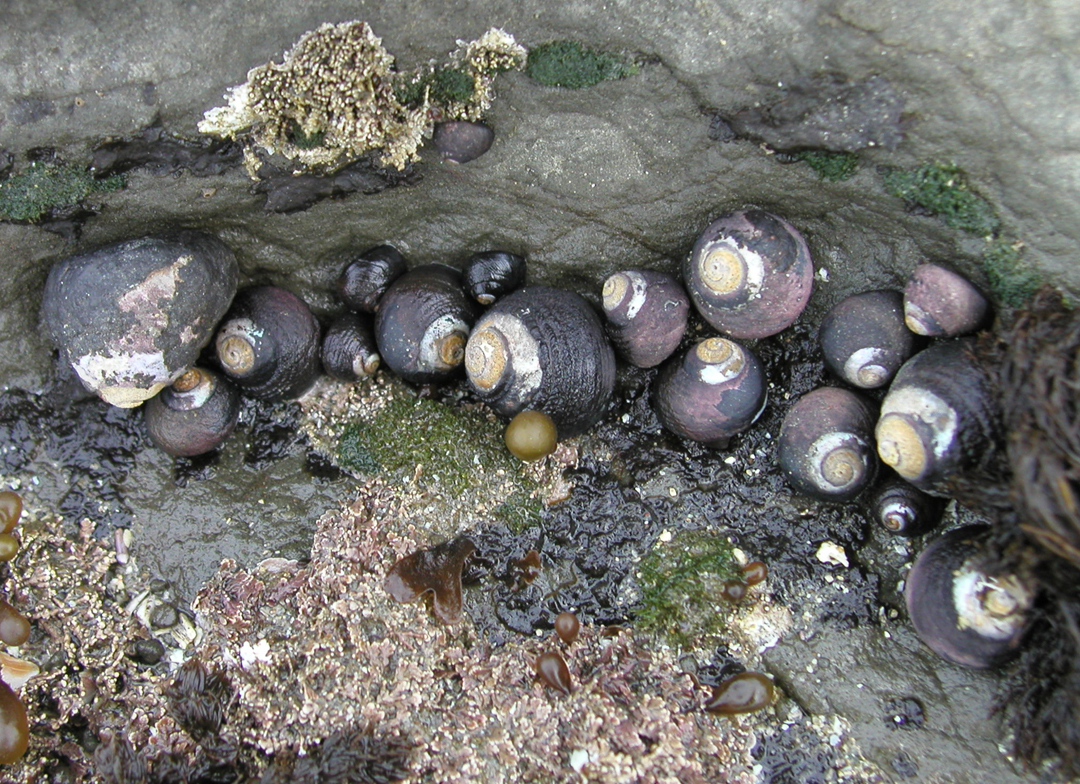
Black turban snail (Tegula funebralis) found in intertidal zones

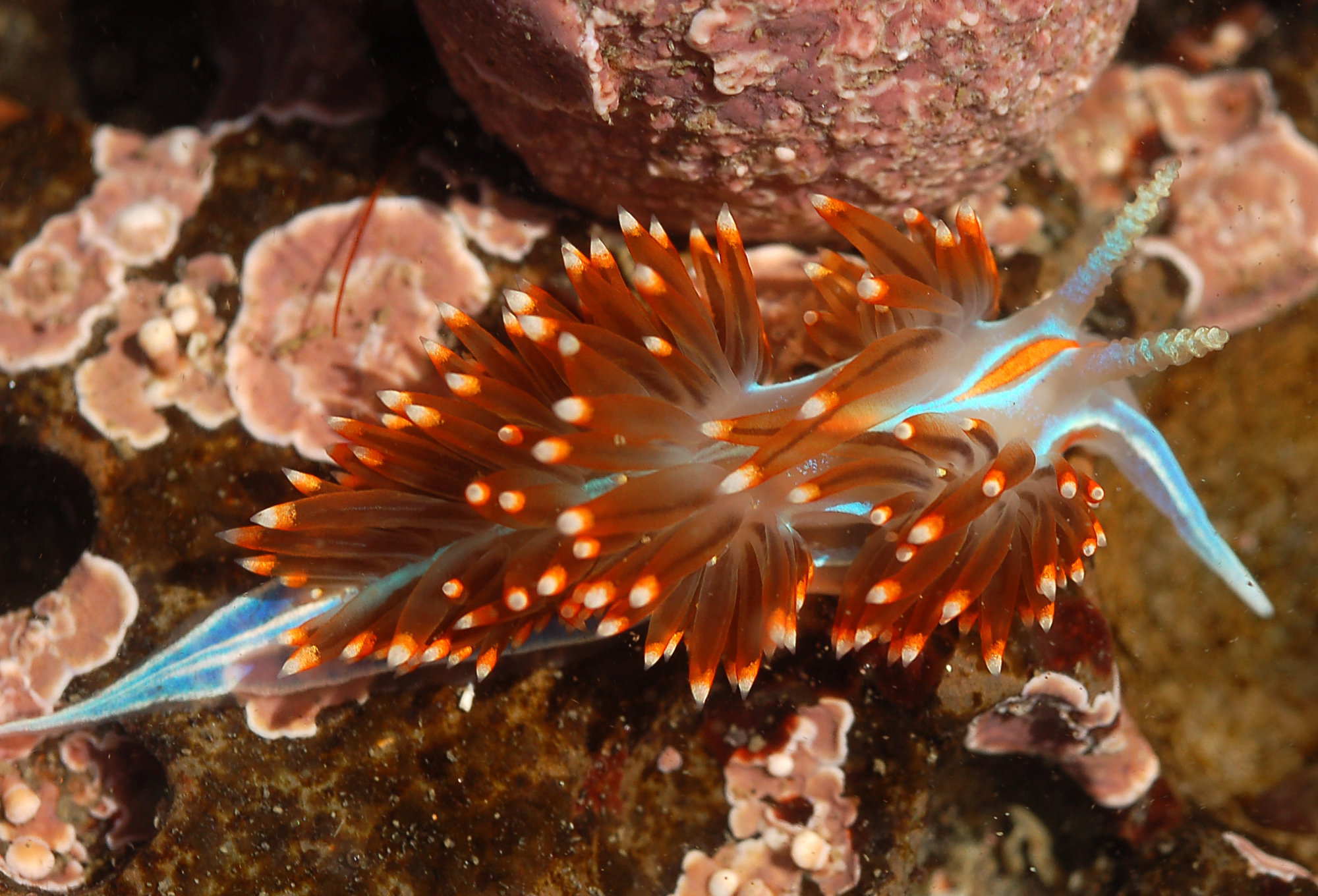
Hermissenda crassicornis found on Docks, rocks, and pilings.

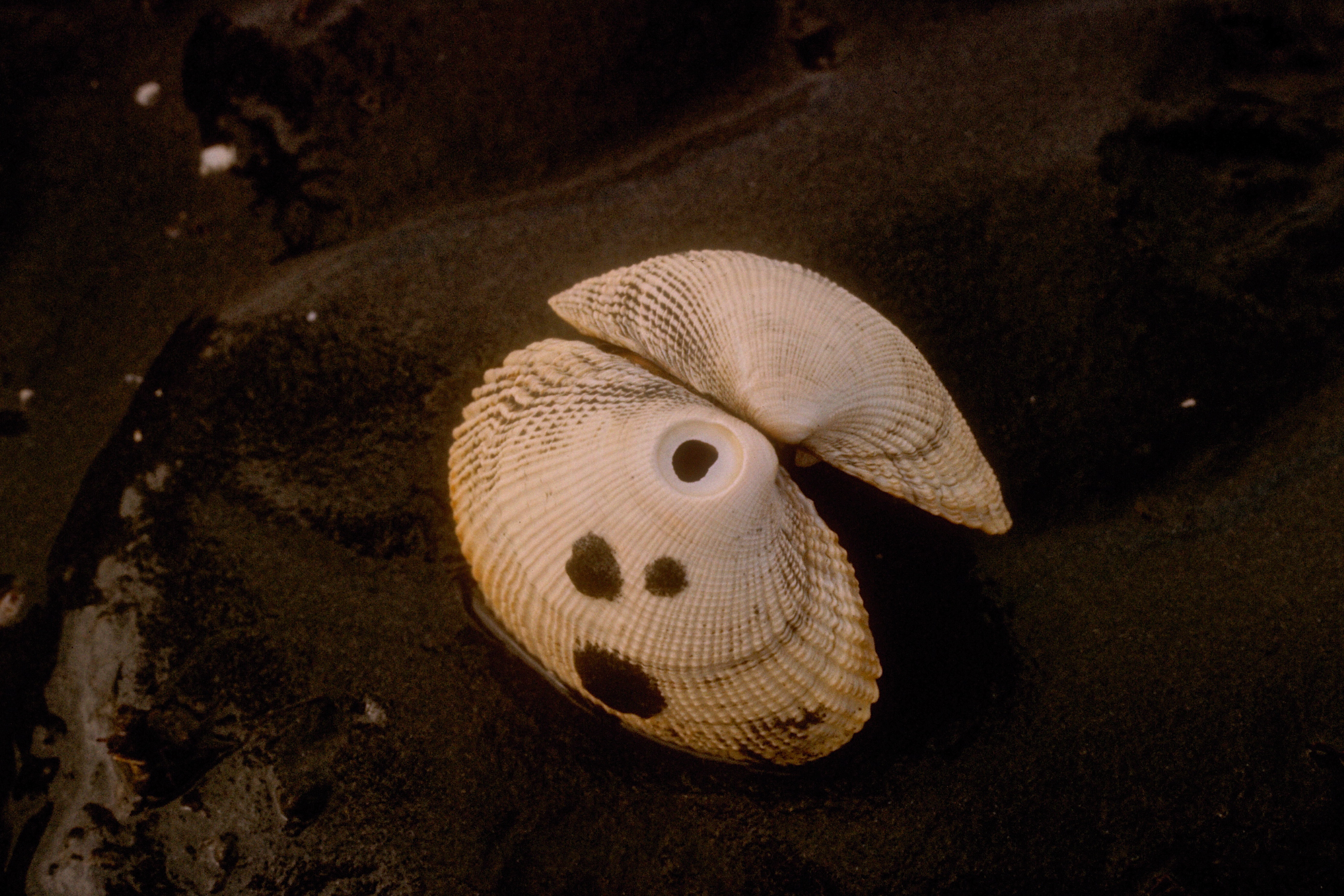
Nuttall's cockle (Clinocardium nuttallii) in intertidal zones

=== Predatory copepods ===
A number of predatory copepods exist throughout the Delta, about which relatively little is known. Sinocalanus doerri, Acartiella sinensis, and Tortanus dextrilobatus all appear to be morphologically capable of predation upon other copepods. Each was introduced to the estuary, probably through ballast water exchange since the 1980s. Generally, they are not in sufficient abundance to negatively impact copepod consumers; however, periodic blooms of S. doerri and A. sinensis occur which have not been well studied.

=== Macroinvertebrates ===
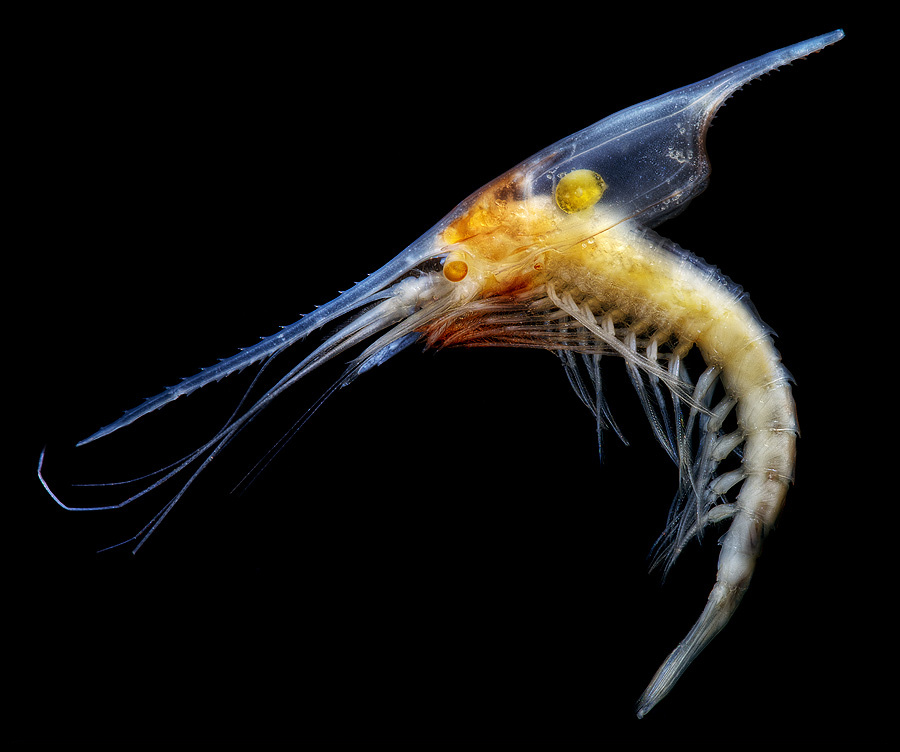
A decline in mysids has been linked to a decline in some fish species that feed on them.

While capable of filter-feeding, mysids (tiny shrimp-like creatures) are largely carnivorous, feeding on copepod adults. They provided an energetic conduit between plankton and planktivorous fishes, including juvenile fishes, sturgeon, Chinook salmon, and American shad. Mysids were once abundant until the native Neomysis mercedis was replaced in the mid-1980s by the invasive Acanthomysis bowmani, which is smaller and less abundant. Mysid decline has been linked to the subsequent decline in a number of fish species in the estuary in the 1980s and '90s.

Shrimp are generalist carnivores who prey largely on mysids and amphipods. Crangon franciscorum represents one of two remaining commercial fisheries in the estuary. While no longer used for "San Francisco Bay shrimp cocktails", they are harvested for bait. Other predators include striped bass and Chinook salmon adults and smolts.

=== Fish ===
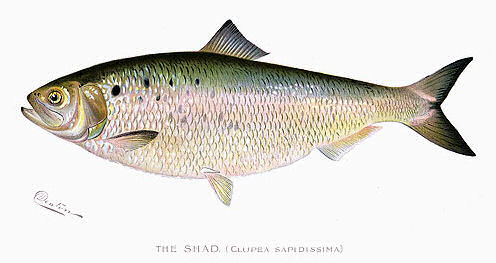
Pregnant American shads compete for food with the Amur River clam.

Because fish are a taxonomically and morphologically diverse group, species vary in their trophic ecologies. In general, fish can be divided into four broad feeding categories: filter feeders, planktivores, piscivores, and benthic feeders.

Filter feeders strain the water column indiscriminately for small prey, typically phyto- and zooplankton. This category of fishes includes Threadfin shad (Dorosoma petenense), American shad (Alosa sapidissima), Inland silversides (Menidia beryllina), and anchovies (Engraulis mordax). Some evidence suggests that these species are food-limited due to depressed plankton levels following the introduction of the Amur River clam. Anchovies have left the LSZ in favor of more productive regions of the estuary in the San Pablo and Central Bays.

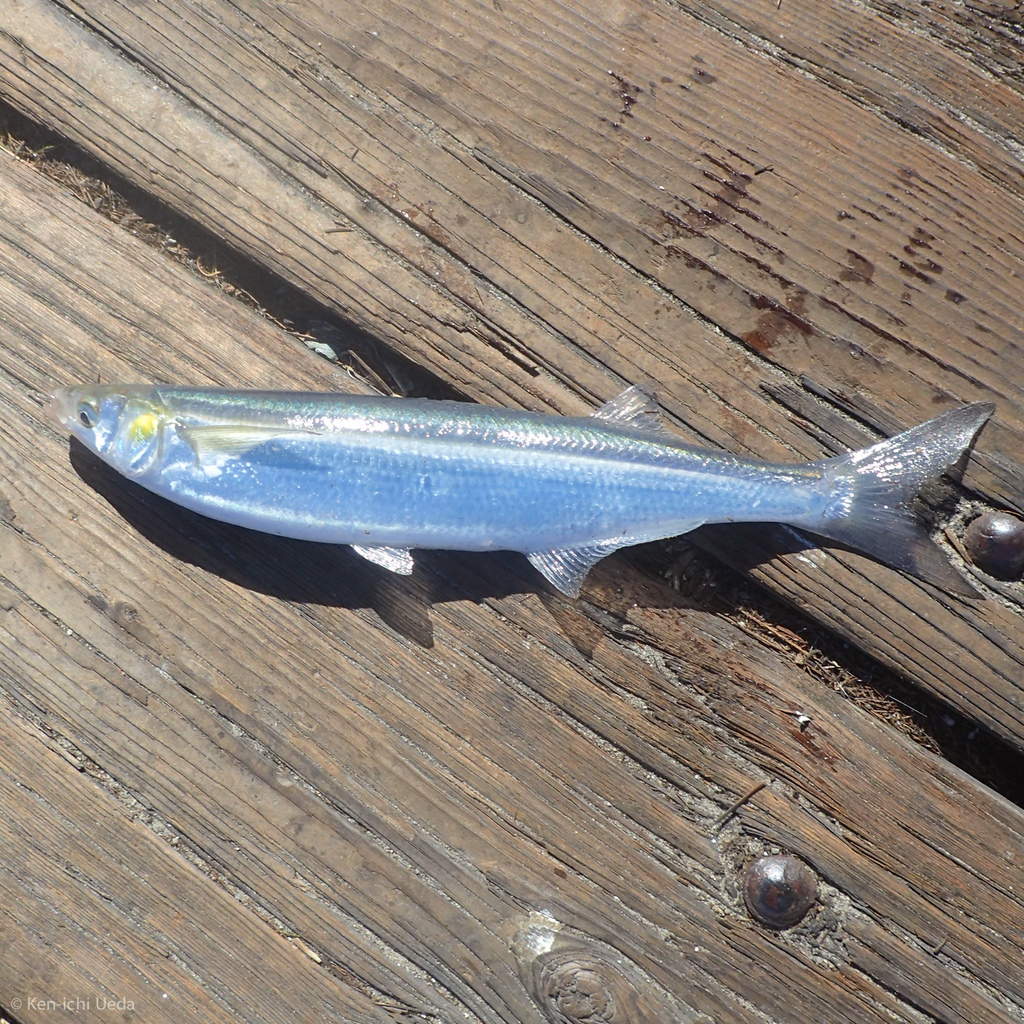
Jacksmelt (Atherinopsis californiensis)

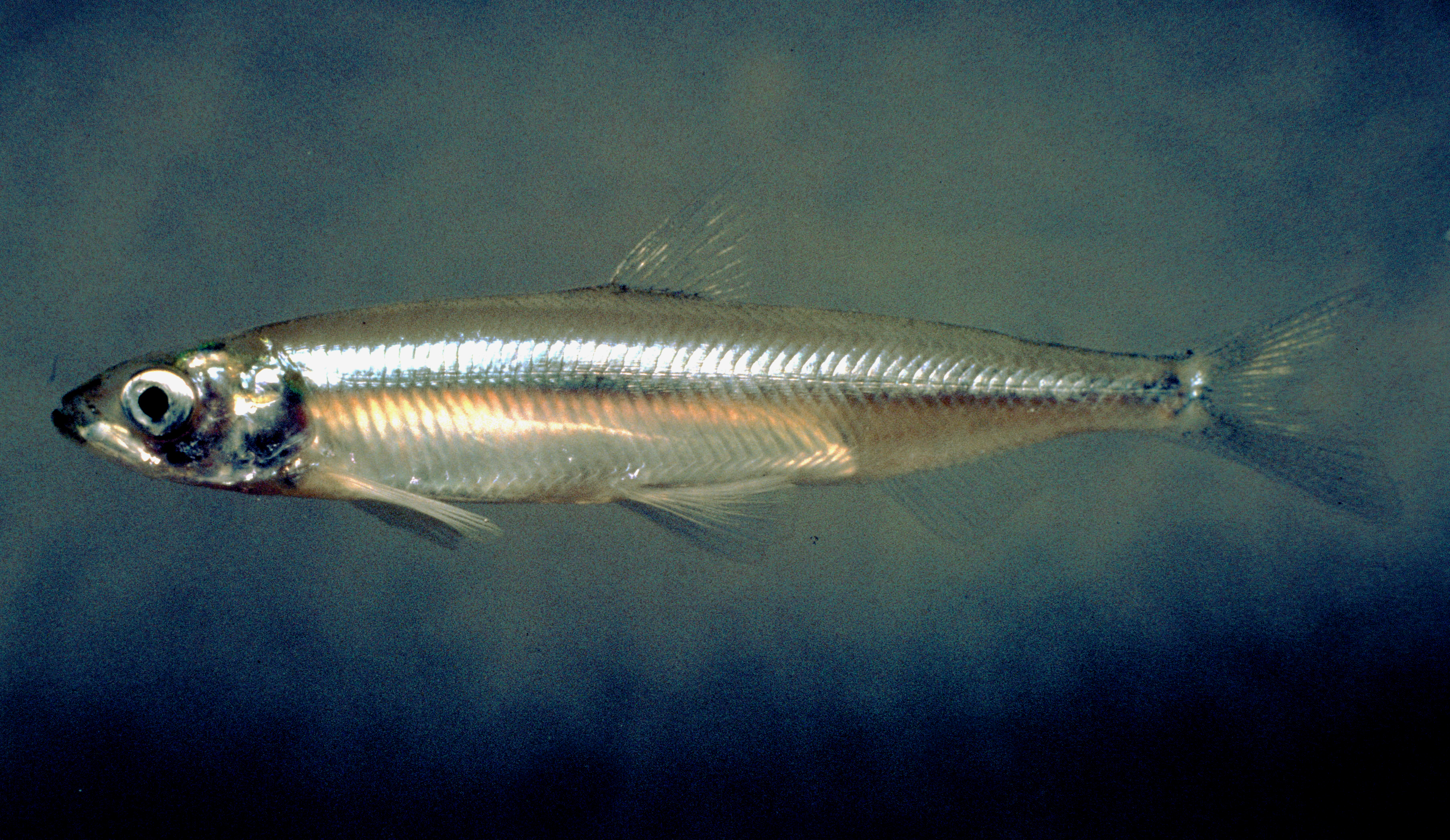
Delta smelt (Hypomesus transpacificus)

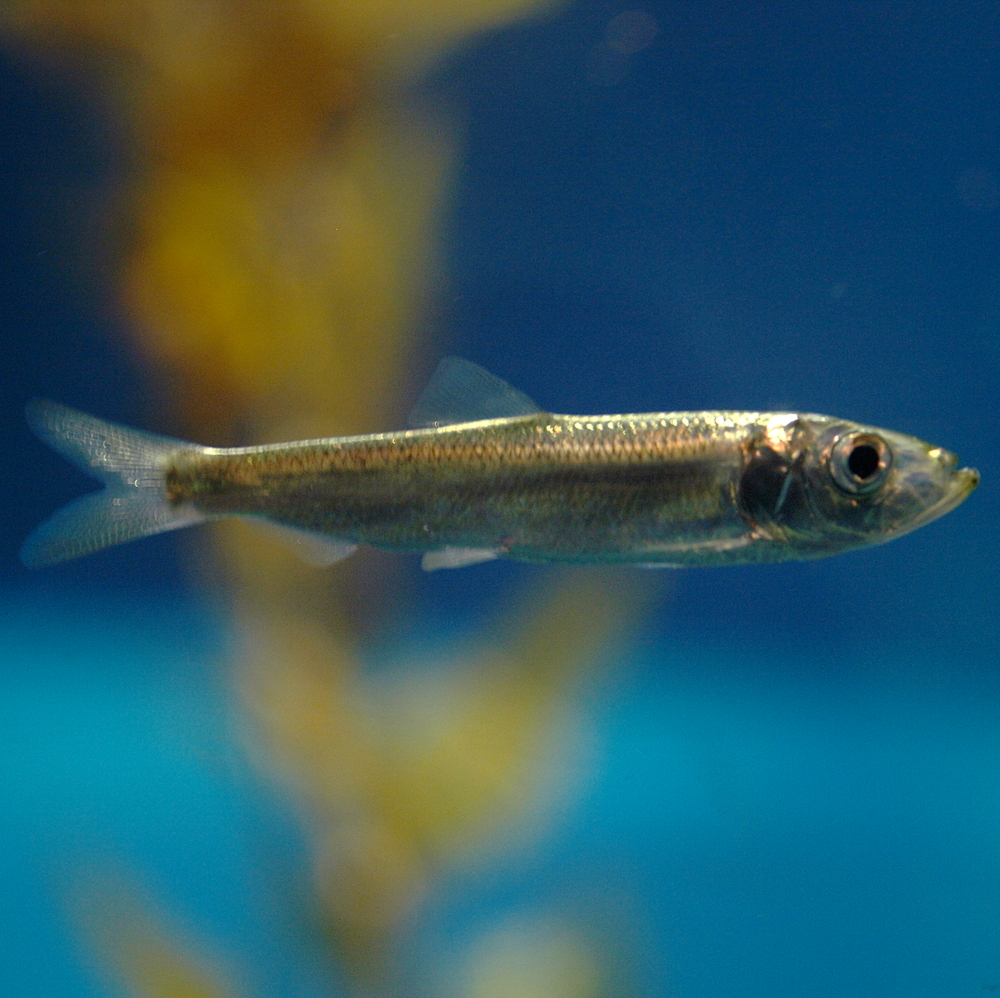
Pacific herring (Clupea pallasii), normally offshore but enter the bay to spawn from November through March.

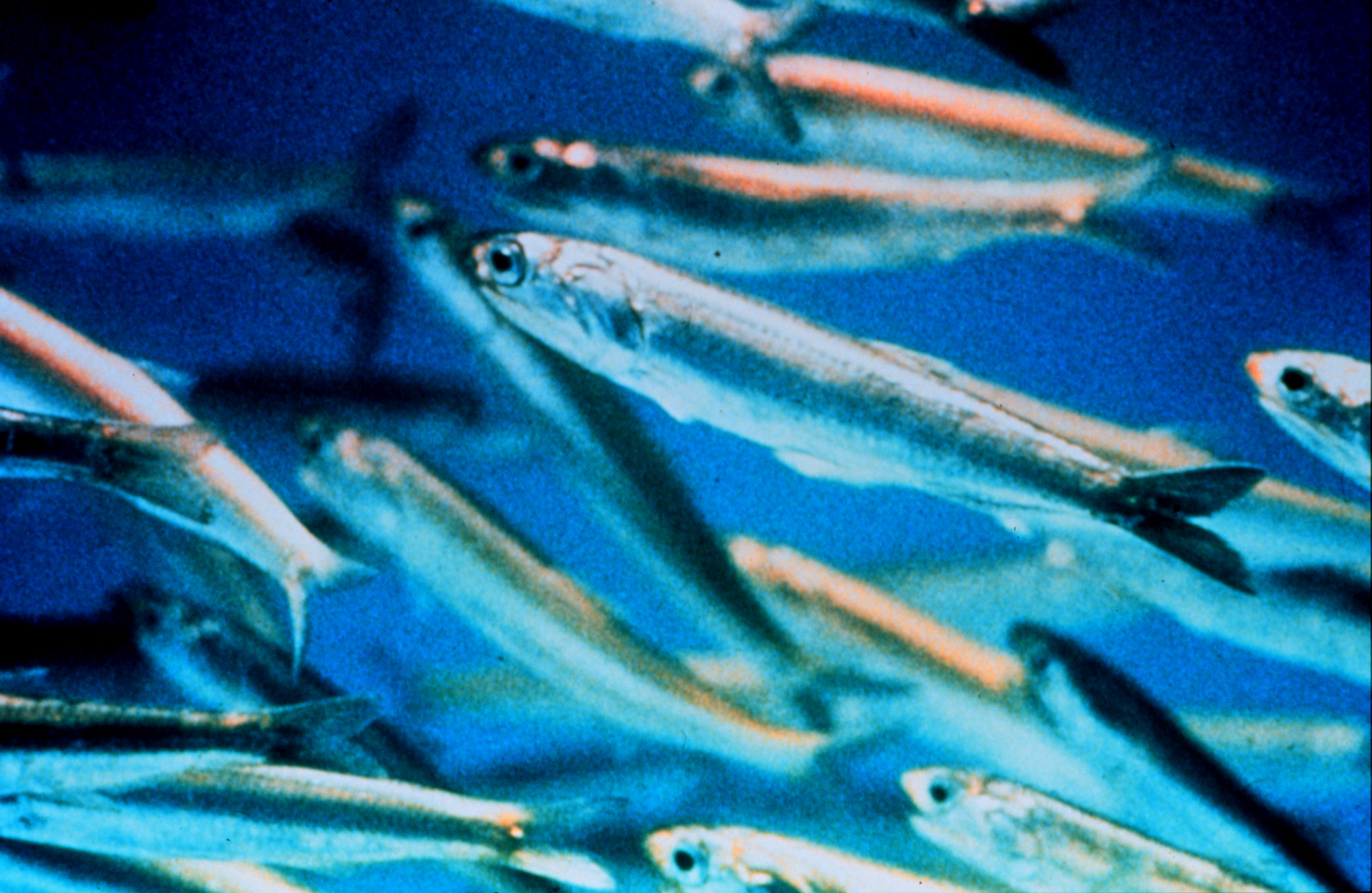
northern anchovy (Engraulis mordax) found in San Pablo and Suisun bay

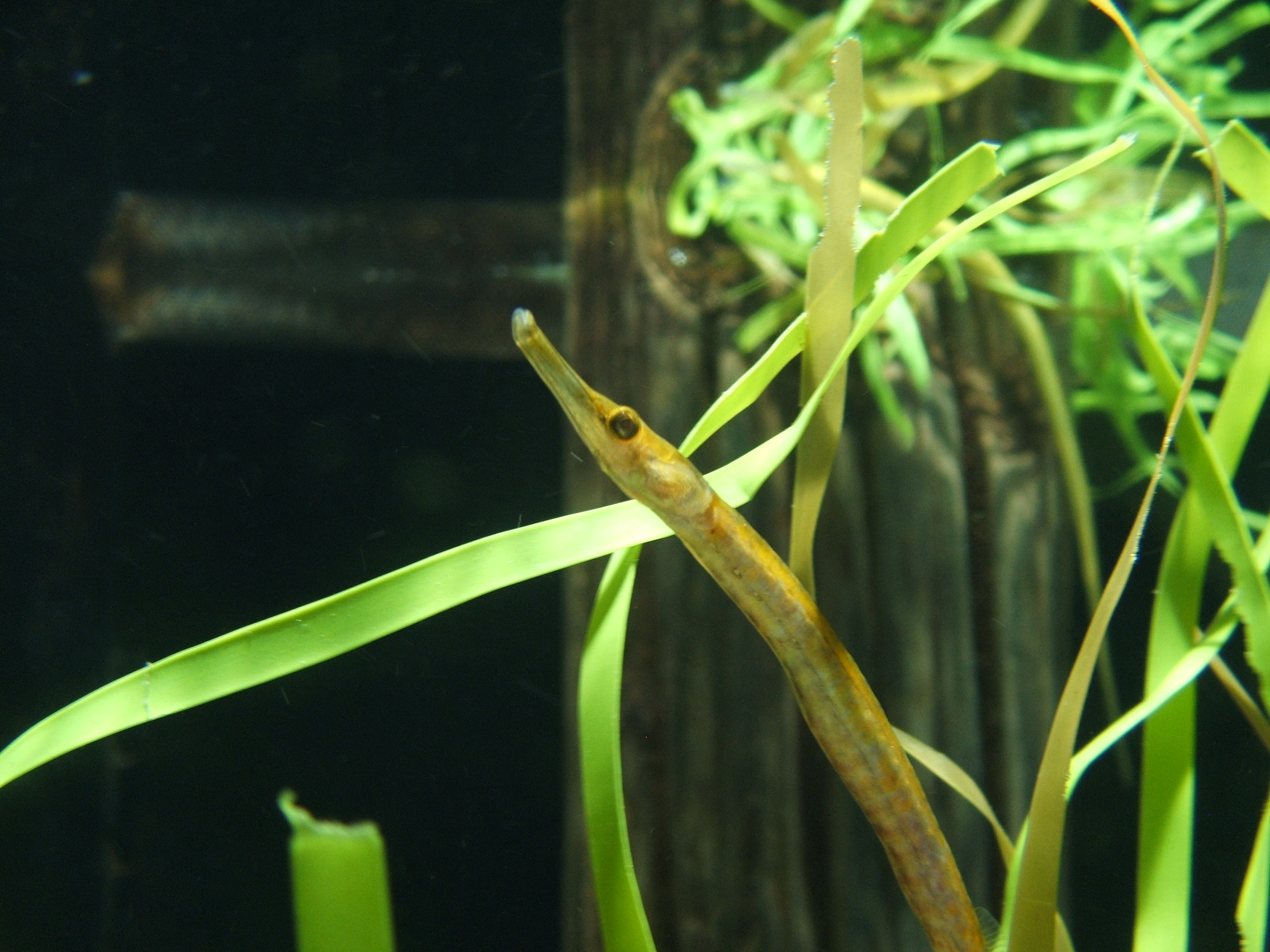
Bay pipefish (Syngnathus leptorhynchus) found in intertidal areas commonly among eelgrass

Planktivores selectively prey upon individual zooplankton, such as copepods, mysids and gammarids. This group includes most fish larvae, Delta smelt (Hypomesus transpacificus) and Longfin smelt (Spirinchus thaleichthys), Tule perch (Hysterocarpus traski), and salmon smolts. The delta smelt is of particular interest due to its endangered status. It may be food-limited, but the evidence is somewhat contradictory. Other factors, such as entrainment of eggs and larvae in the export pumping of fresh water from the Delta may also explain the decline.

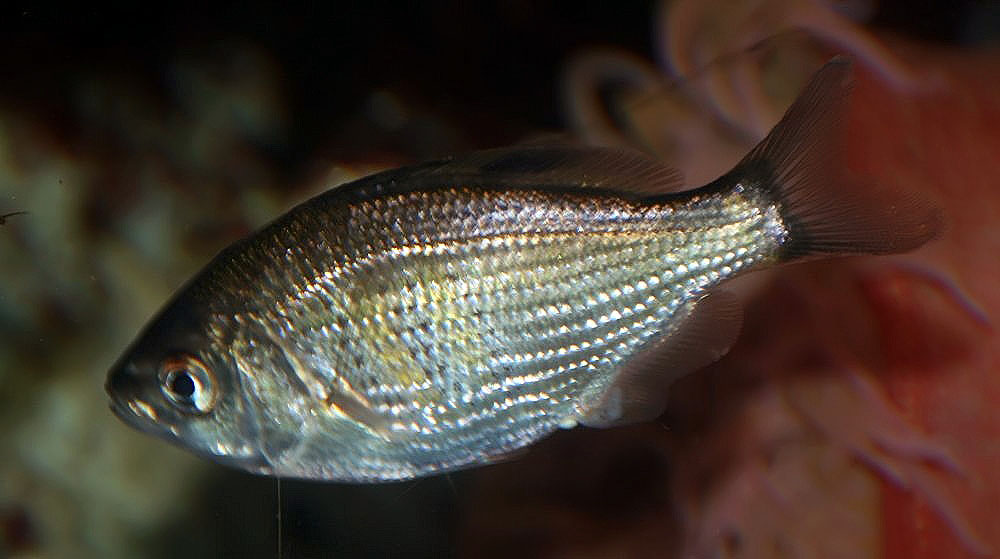
Shiner surfperch(Cymatogaster aggregata) found in subtidal zones

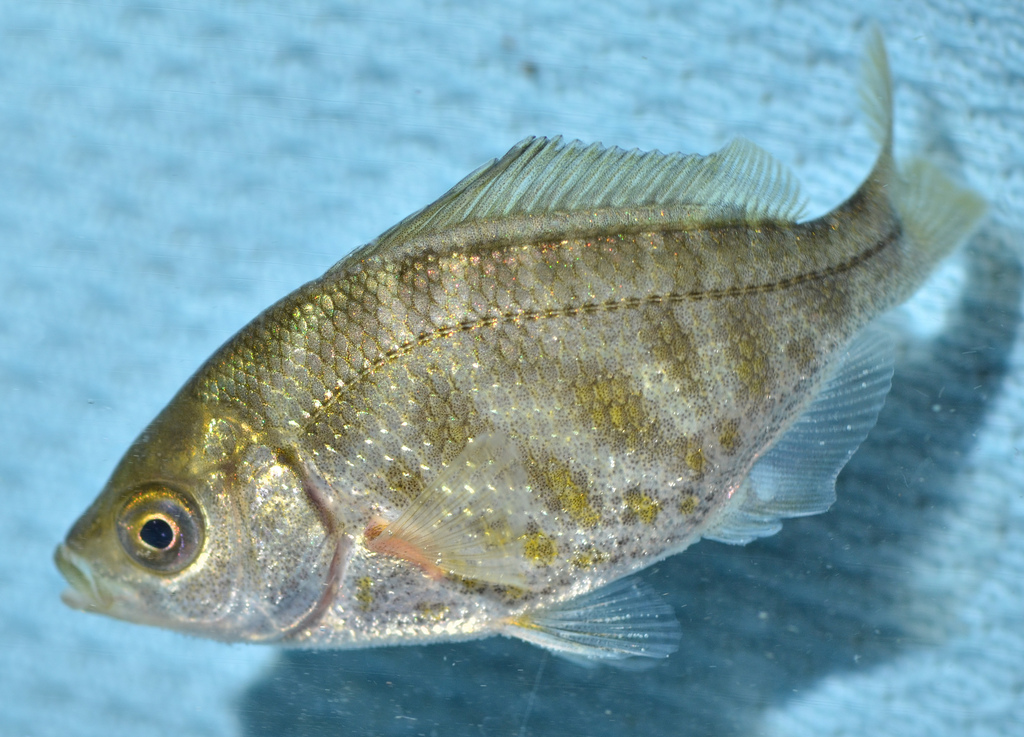
tule perch (Hysterocarpus traskii)

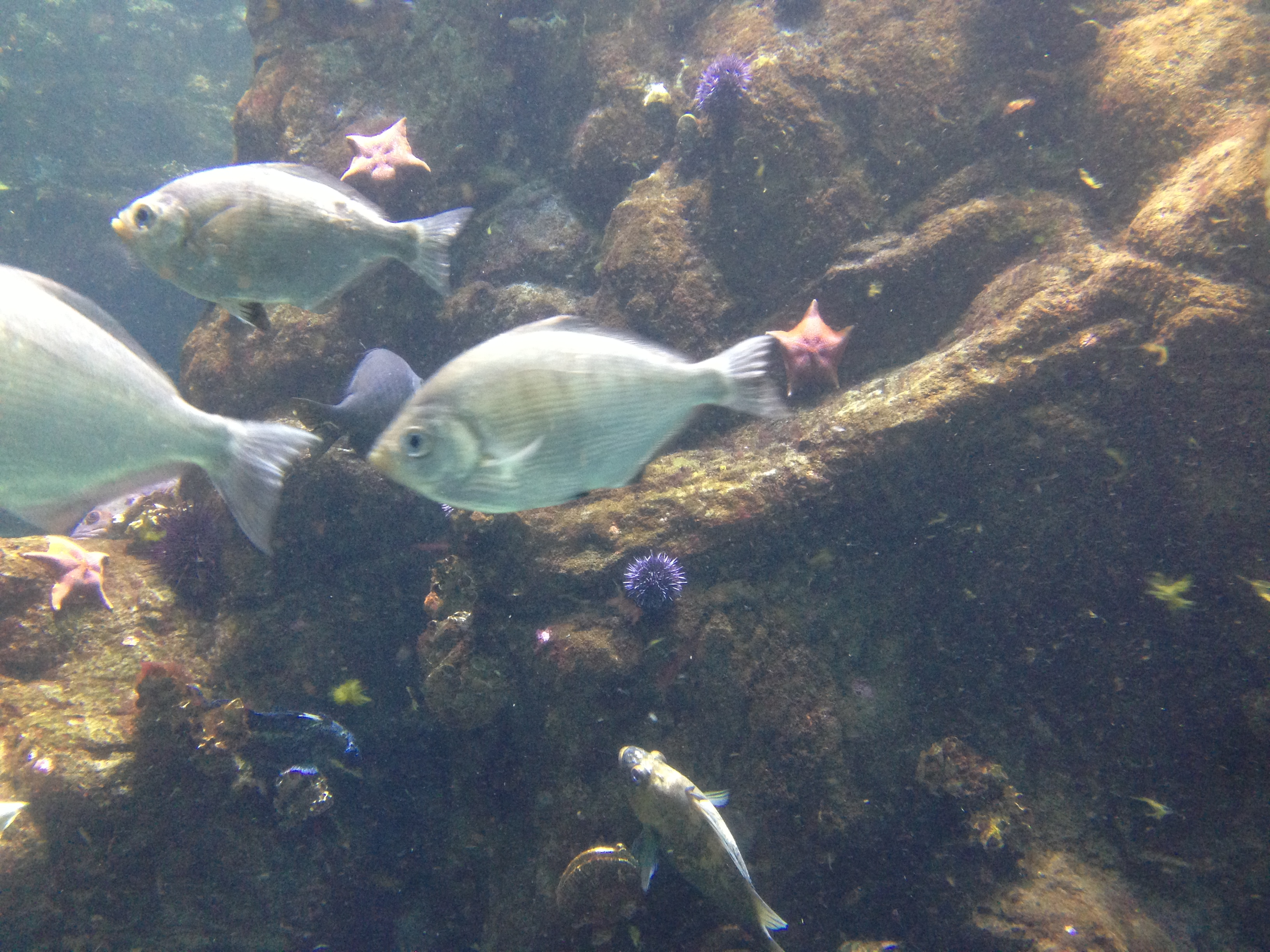
Walleye surfperch (Hyperprosopon argenteum)

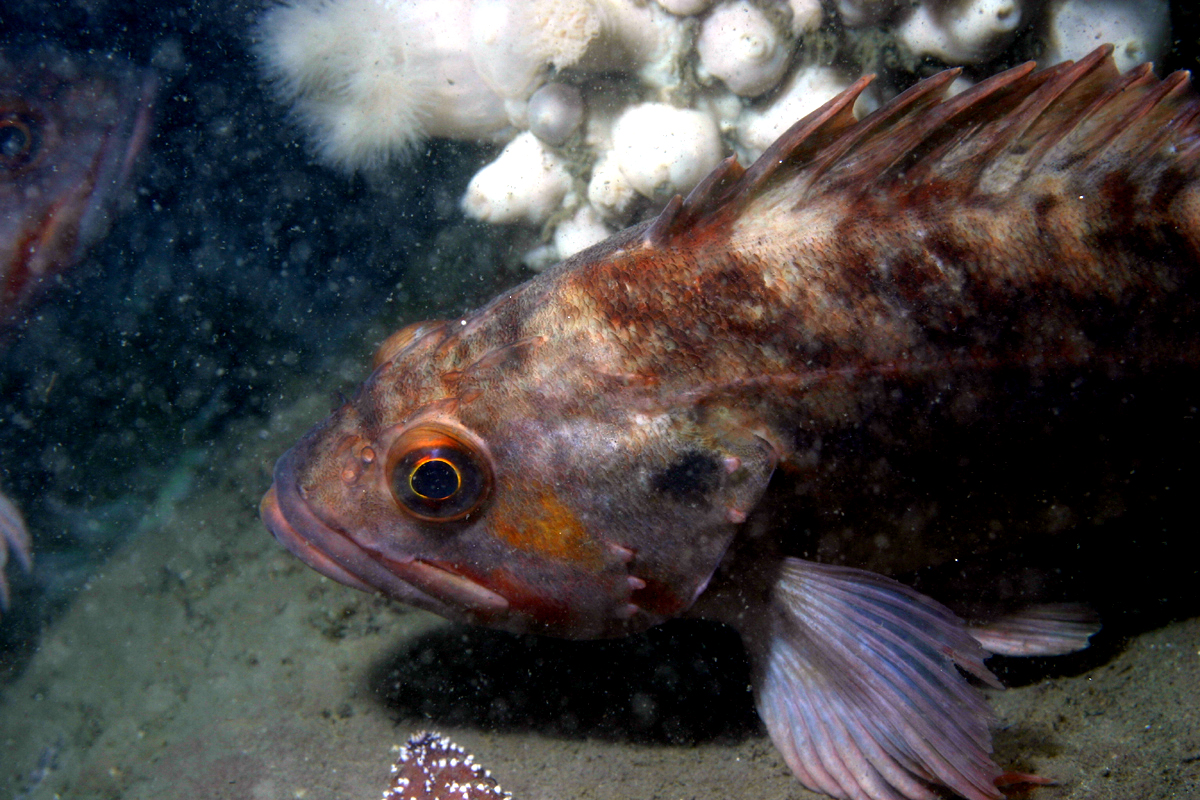
brown rockfish (Sebastes auriculatus)

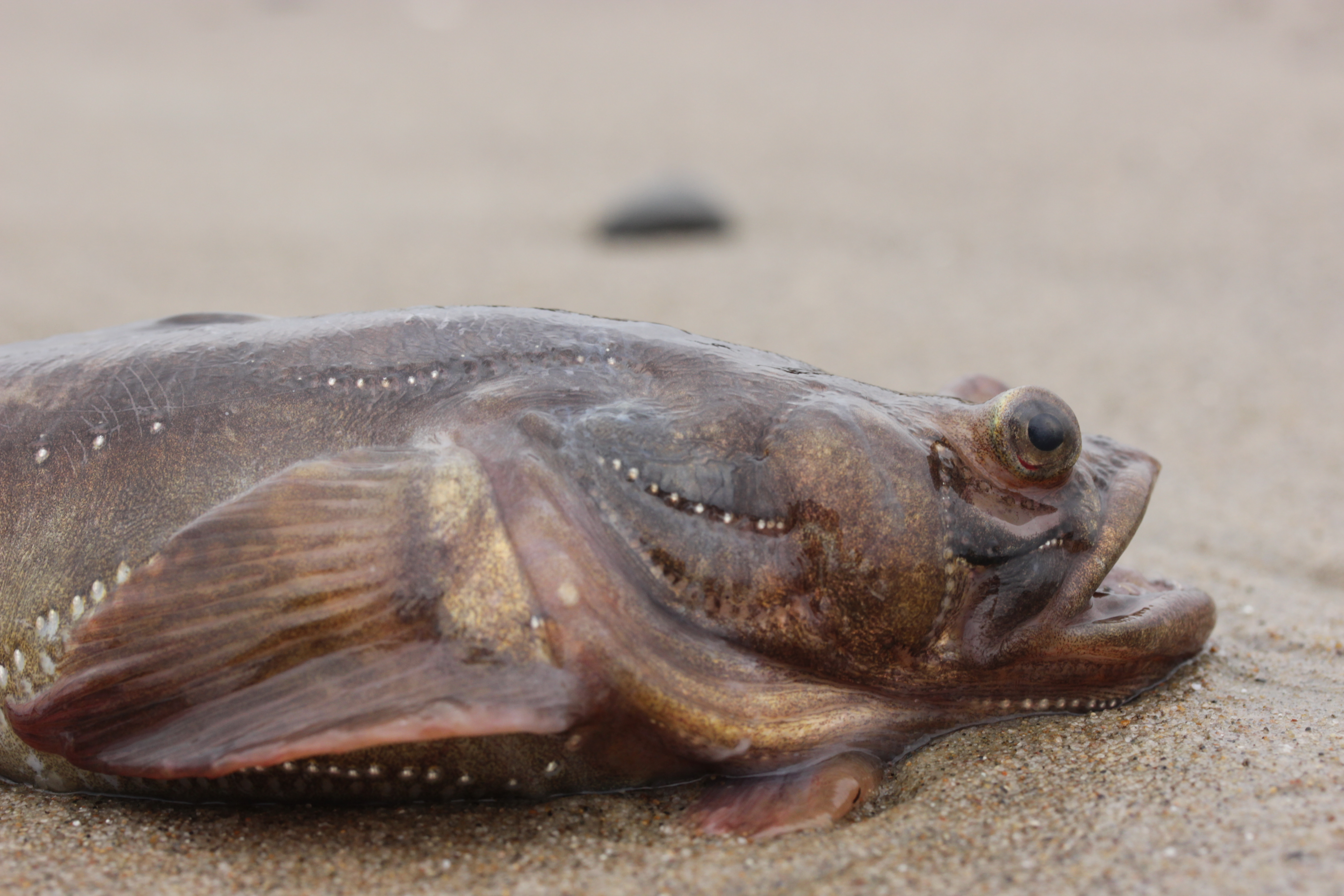
Humming toadfish (Porichthys notatus) found in subtidal zones

The main piscivore of the LSZ is the striped bass (Morone saxatilis), which was introduced in the 1890s and preys heavily upon native fishes. Striped bass are an important sport fishery in the San Francisco Estuary, and as such, represent a minor withdrawal of biomass from the estuary.

Benthic, or bottom-dwelling, fishes include white sturgeon (Acipenser transmontanus), white catfish (Ameiurus catus), and starry flounder (Platichthys stellatus). Because of their habitat orientation, they feed primarily on epibenthic organisms such as amphipods, bay shrimp, and bivalves. These fish are known to feed at least occasionally on the Amur River clam, which would represent one of the few channels for energy flow from that species, except for detrital production.

The sole commercial fishery in the LSZ is for bait shrimp. There are a variety of sports fisheries that represent a minor flow of carbon, but significant flows of capital to local economies around the estuary. Most of the recreational fisheries surround striped bass, sturgeon, and introduced fresh water basses in the freshwater Delta. This paucity of fisheries makes the San Francisco Estuary unique. Nearly all estuaries worldwide support at least remnants of significant fisheries. The San Francisco Estuary at one time supported major fisheries for salmon, anchovies, and Dungeness crabs until the 1950s. The demise of these fisheries was probably due more to habitat loss than overharvesting.

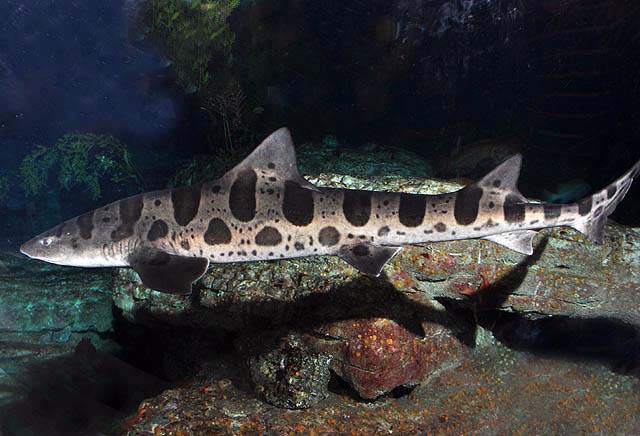
Leopard shark (Triakis semifasciata)

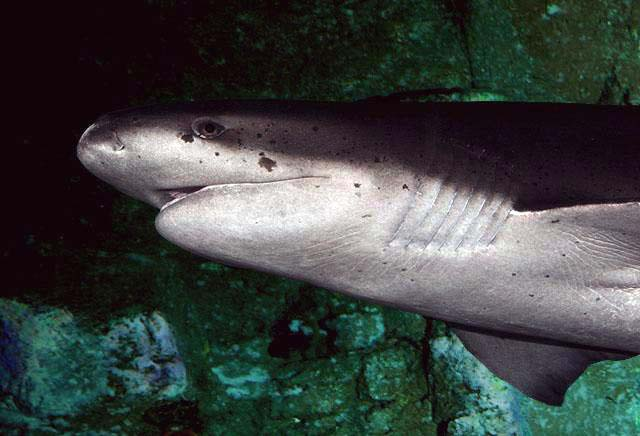
broadnose sevengill shark (Notorynchus cepedianus)

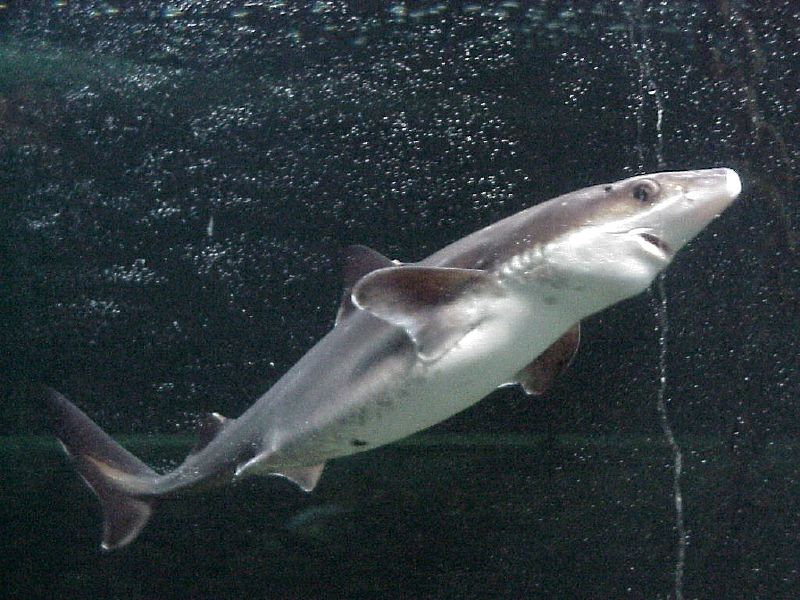
spiny dogfish(Squalus acanthias) found in the subtidal zone

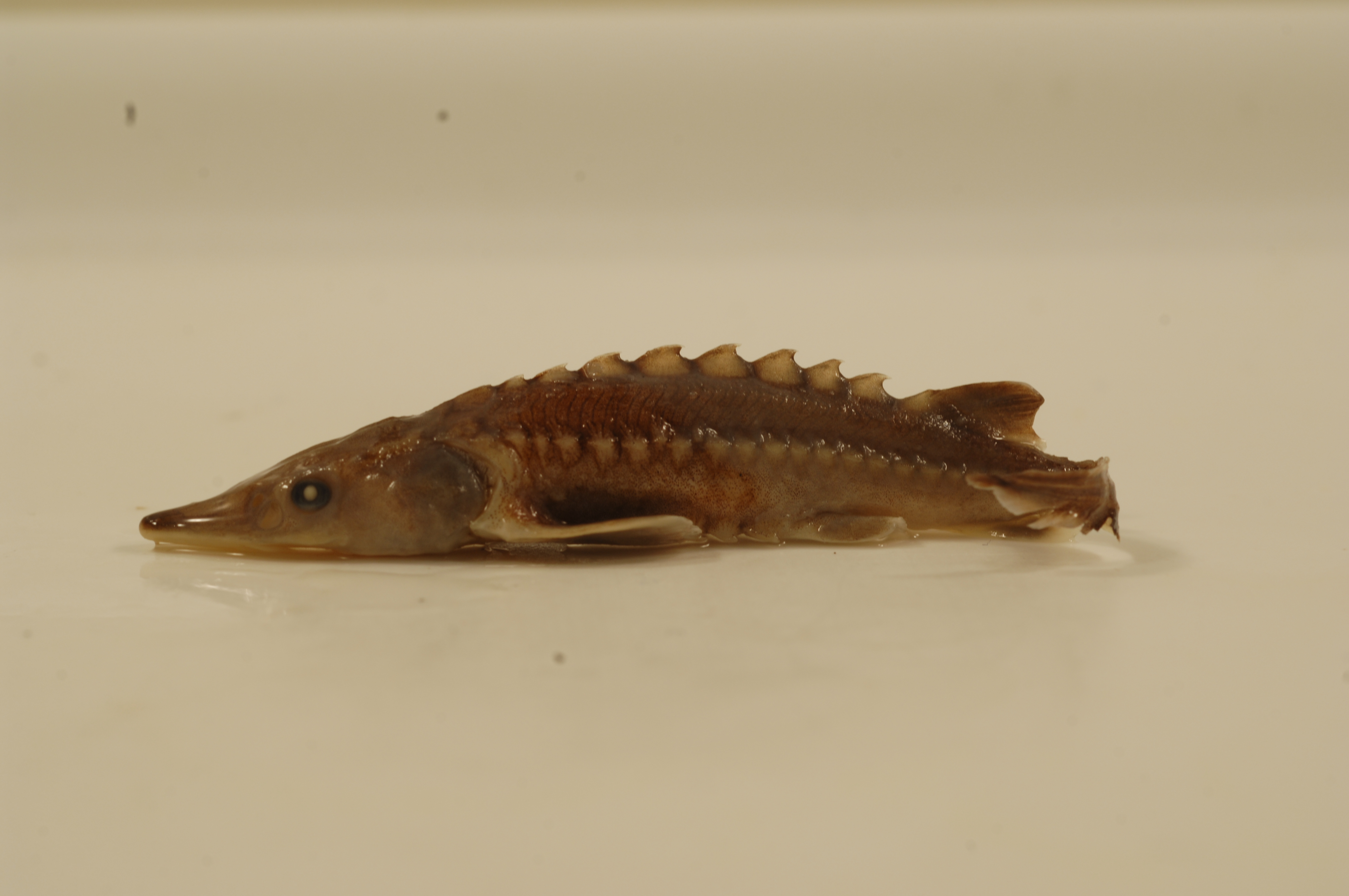
North American green sturgeon (Acipenser medirostris)

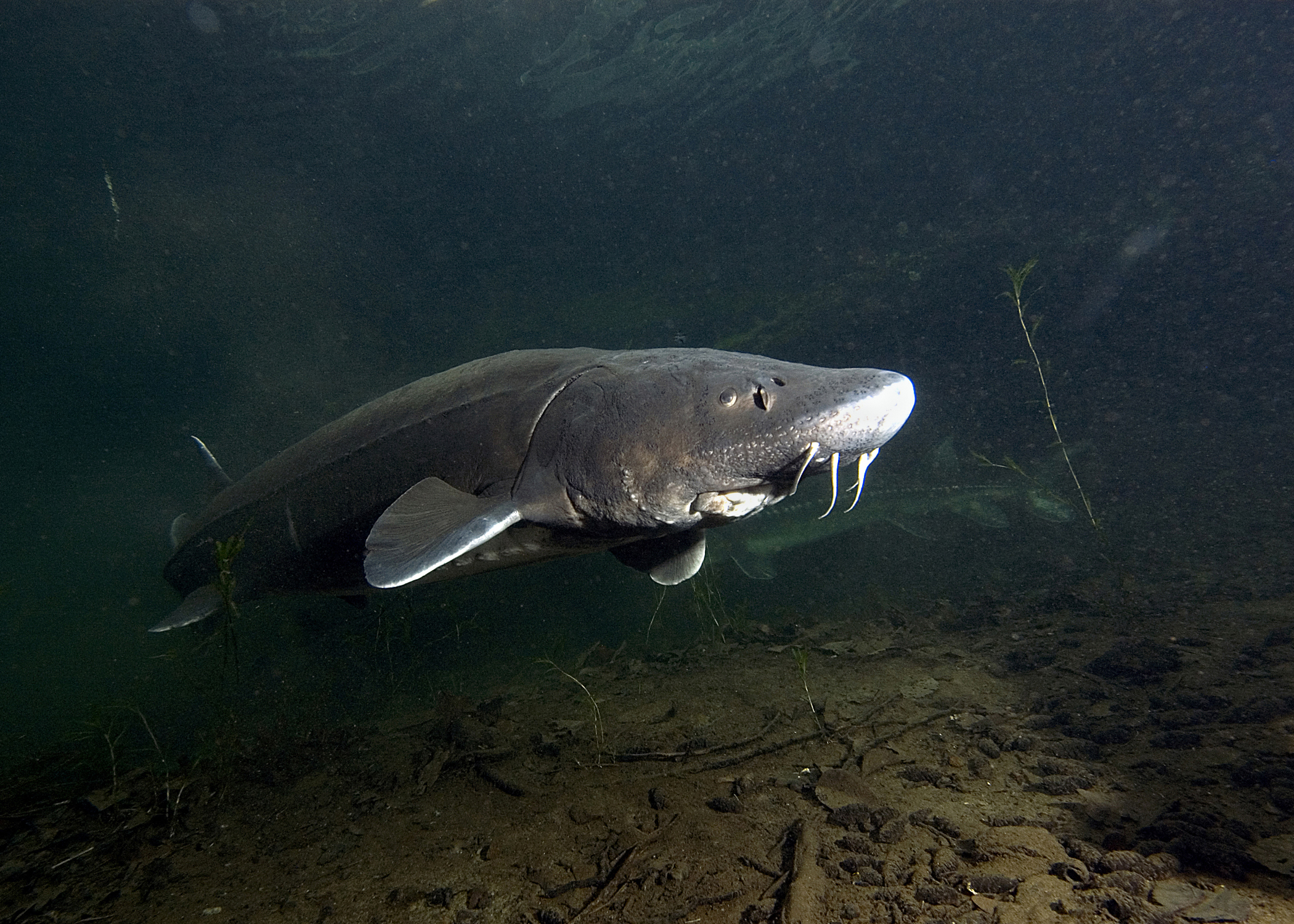
White sturgeon (Acipenser transmontanus)

=== Birds ===
The San Francisco Estuary is a major stop on the Pacific flyway for migrating waterfowl. Yet little is known about the flow of carbon in or out of the estuary via birds. Millions of waterfowl annually use the bay shallows as a refuge. Most of the birds are dabbling ducks that feed on submerged aquatic vegetation. Diving ducks (such as scaups) feed on epibenthic organisms like C. amurensis, representing a possible flow of carbon from that otherwise dead end. Two endangered species of birds are found here: the California least tern and the California clapper rail. Exposed bay muds provide important feeding areas for shorebirds, but underlying layers of bay mud pose geological hazards for structures near many parts of the bay perimeter. Piscivorous birds such as double-crested cormorant and brown pelicans also inhabit the estuary, but their trophic impact remains poorly studied.

In January 2015, scientists were working to identify a gray, thick, sticky, odorless substance coating on birds along San Francisco Bay shorelines. Hundreds of birds have died, and hundreds more have been coated with the substance. Scientists are concerned about other wildlife that may be at risk from the substance.

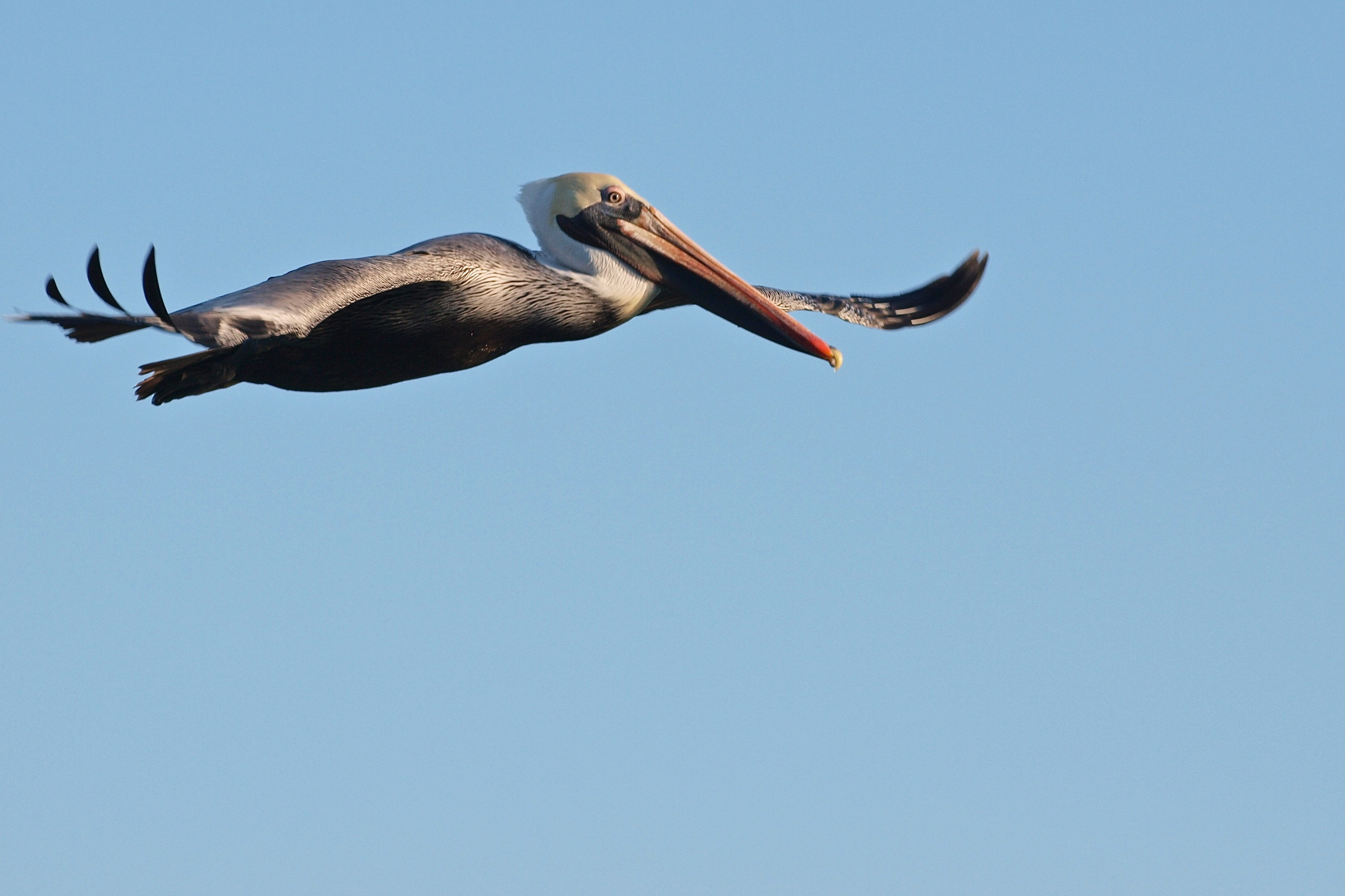
Brown Pelican (Pelecanus occidentalis californicus) at San Francisco Bay

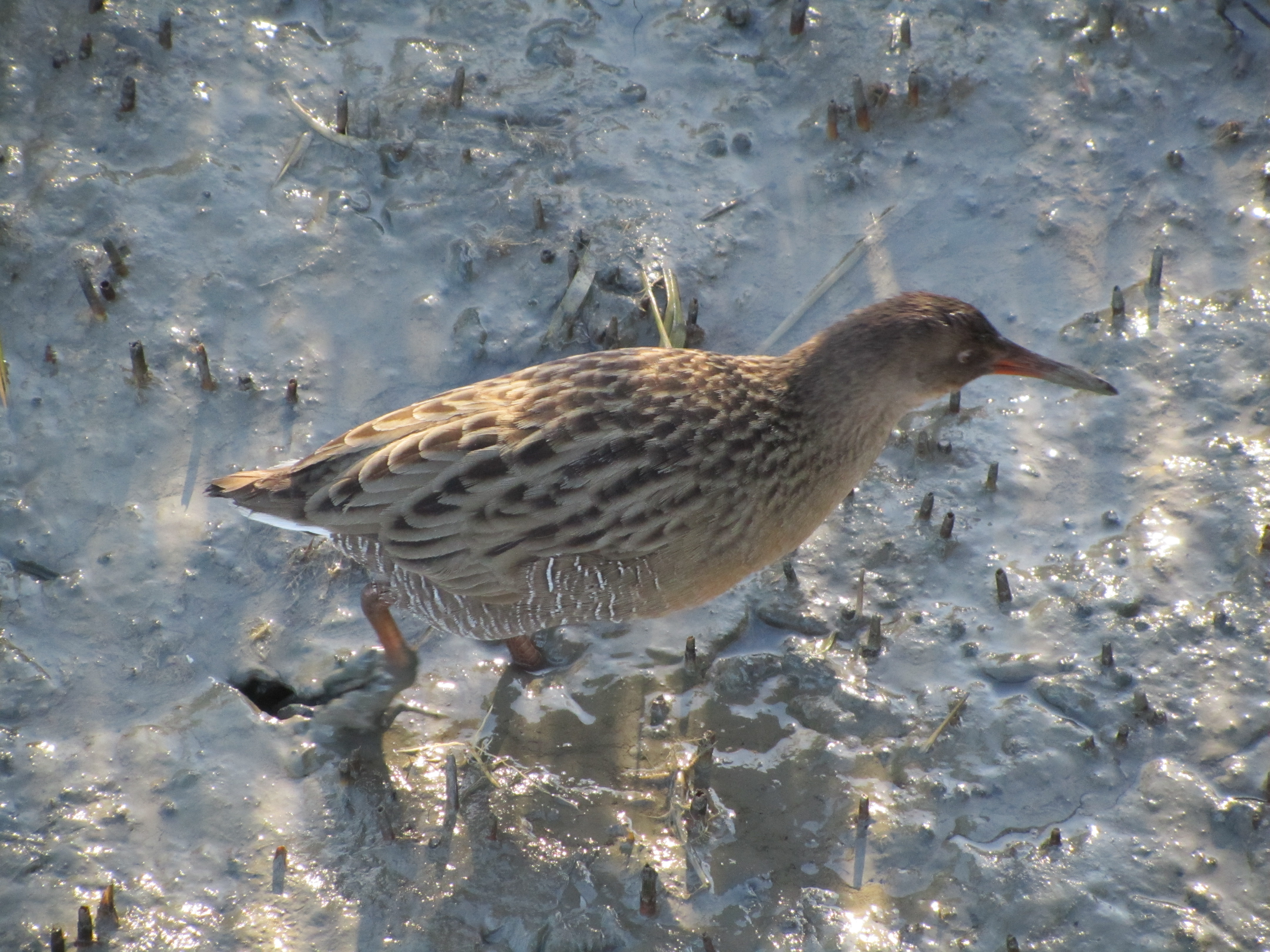
Ridgway's rail (Rallus obsoletus) in Oakland

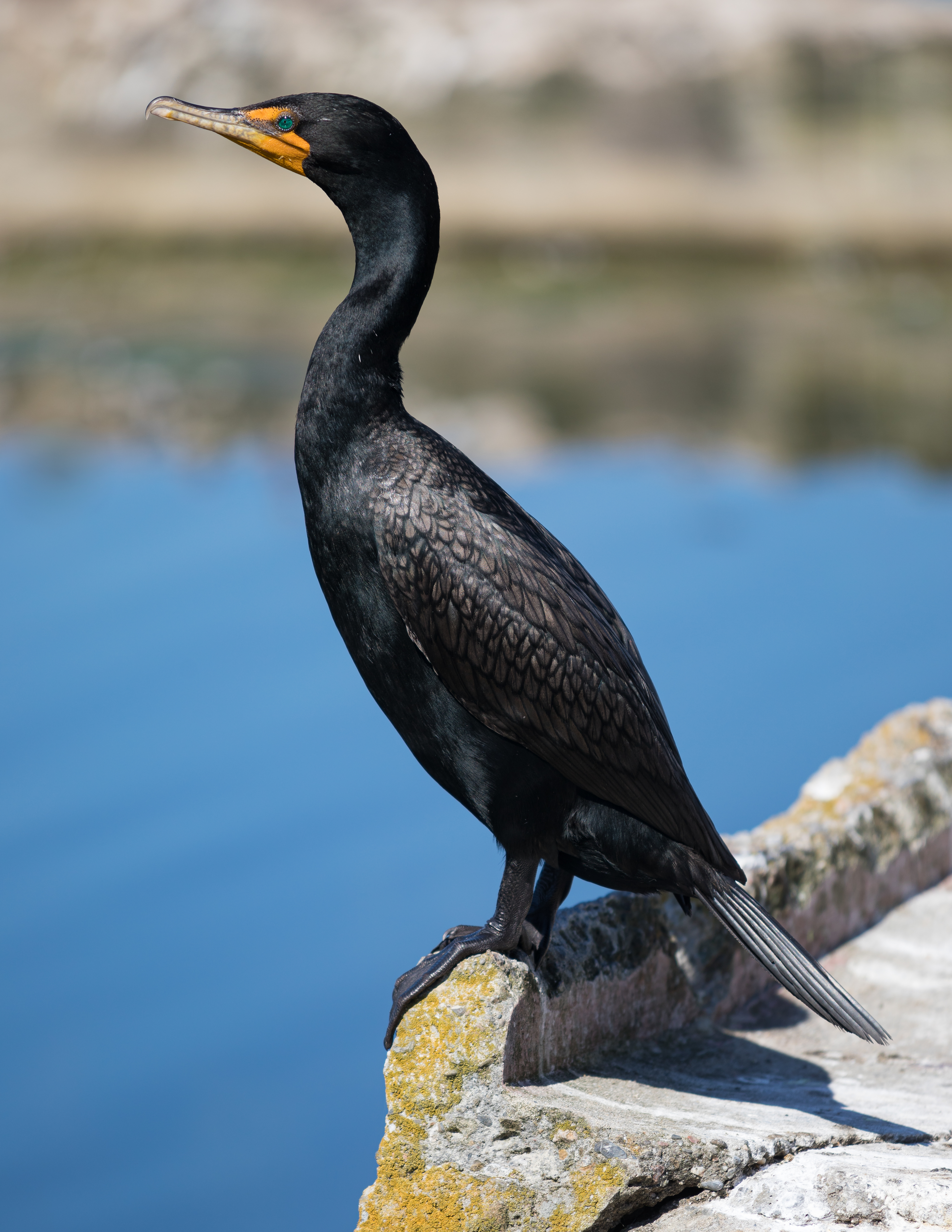
double-crested cormorant

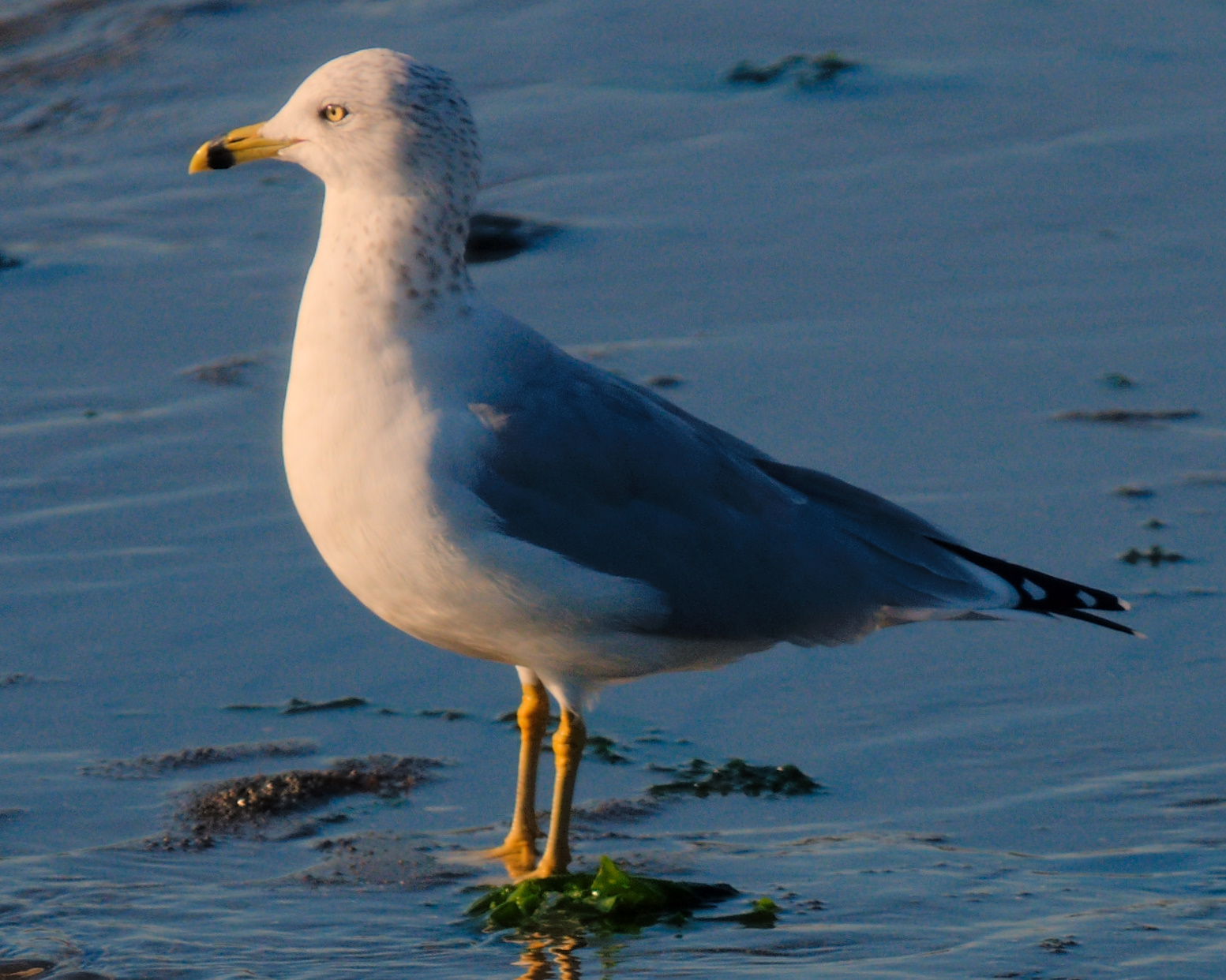
Ring-billed gull (Larus delawarensis) in Oakland

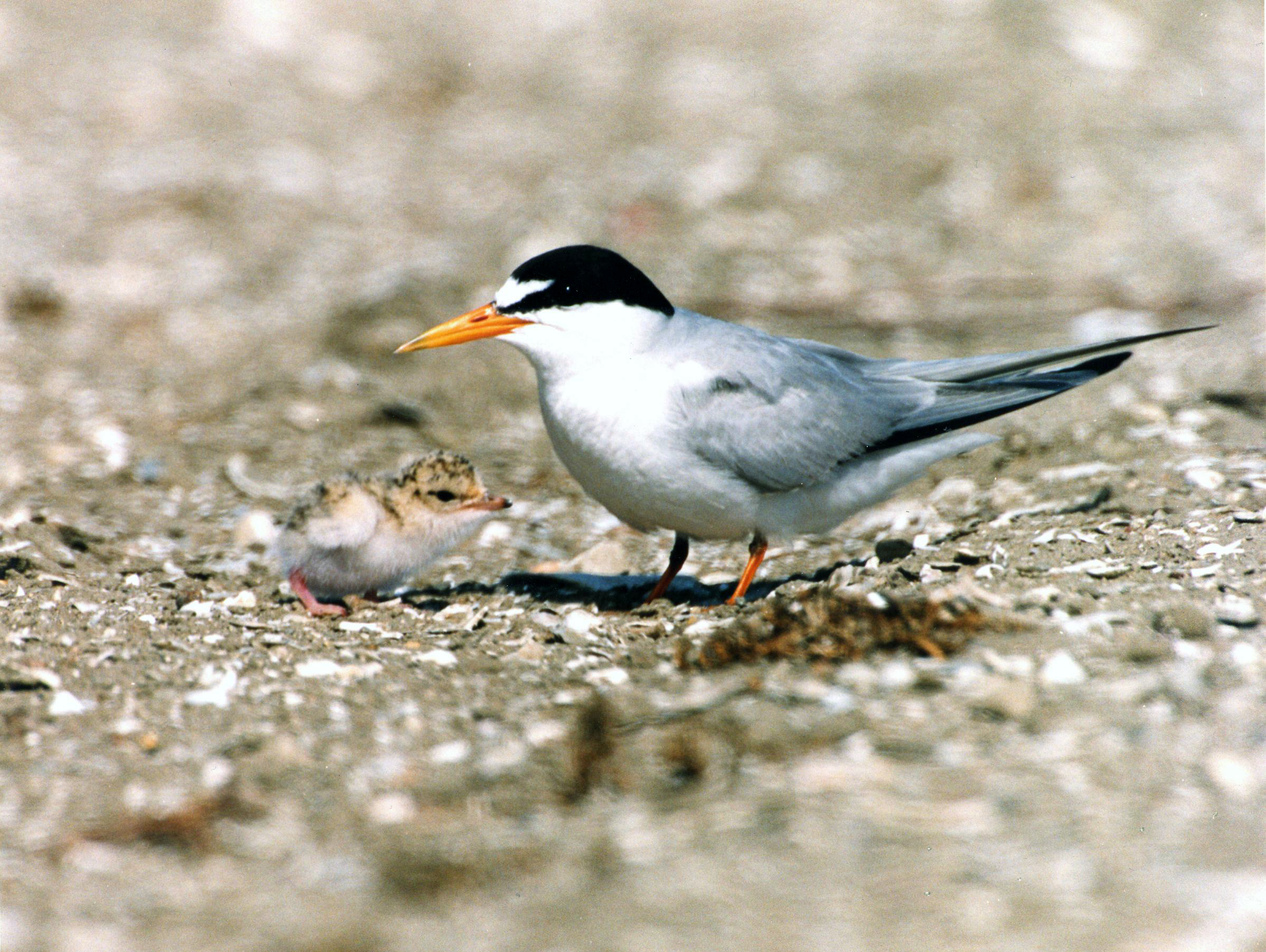
California least tern

=== Mammals ===
Before 1825, Spanish, French, English, Russians and Americans were drawn to the Bay Area to harvest prodigious quantities of beaver (Castor canadensis), river otter, marten, fisher, mink, fox, weasel, harbor seals and Sea Lions (Zalophus californianus) and sea otter (Enhydra lutris). This early fur trade, known as the California Fur Rush, was more than any other single factor, responsible for opening up the West and the San Francisco Bay Area, in particular, to world trade. By 1817 sea otter in the area were practically eliminated. The Russians maintained a sealing station in the nearby Farallon Islands from 1812 to 1840, taking 1,200 to 1,500 fur seals annually, though American ships had already exploited the islands. By 1818 the seals diminished rapidly until only about 500 could be taken annually and within the next few years, the fur seal was extirpated from the islands until they began to recolonize the islands in 1996.

Although 20th-century naturalists were skeptical that beaver were historically extant in coastal streams or the Bay itself, earlier records show that the California golden beaver (Castor canadensis ssp. subauratus) was one of the most valued of the animals taken, and apparently was found in great abundance. Thomas McKay reported that in one year the Hudson's Bay Company took 4,000 beaver skins on the shores of San Francisco Bay. Recently, beaver have recolonized the brackish Napa Sonoma Marsh in north San Pablo Bay and its Sonoma Creek and Napa River tributaries. Beaver are also recolonizing the South Bay, having been translocated to upper Los Gatos Creek at Lexington Reservoir in the 1980s. They subsequently migrated downstream to the Guadalupe River, and upon reaching saltwater, have used it to recolonize east to Coyote Creek and northwest to Matadero Creek in Palo Alto.

North American river otter (Lontra canadensis) are also re-colonizing the Bay and its tributaries. River otter in the Bay were first reported in Redwood Creek at Muir Beach in 1996, and recently in Corte Madera Creek, and in the south Bay on Coyote Creek, as well as in 2010 in San Francisco Bay itself at the Richmond Marina.

For the first time in 65 years, Pacific Harbor Porpoise (Phocoena phocoena) returned to the Bay in 2009. Golden Gate Cetacean Research, a non-profit organization focused on research on cetaceans, has developed a photo-identification database enabling the scientists to identify specific porpoise individuals and is trying to ascertain whether a healthier bay has brought their return. Pacific harbor porpoise range from Point Conception, California, to Alaska and across to the Kamchatka Peninsula and Japan. Recent genetic studies show that there is a local stock from San Francisco to the Russian River and that eastern Pacific coastal populations rarely migrate far, unlike western Atlantic Harbor porpoise.

The common bottlenose dolphin (Tursiops truncatus) has been extending its current range northwards from the Southern California Bight. The first coastal bottlenose dolphin in the San Francisco Bay Area in recent times was spotted in 1983 off the San Mateo County coast in 1983. In 2001 bottlenose dolphins were first spotted east of the Golden Gate Bridge and confirmed by photographic evidence in 2007. Zooarcheological remains of bottlenose dolphins indicated that bottlenose dolphins inhabited San Francisco Bay in prehistoric times until at least 700 years before present, and dolphin skulls dredged from the Bay suggest occasional visitors in historic times.

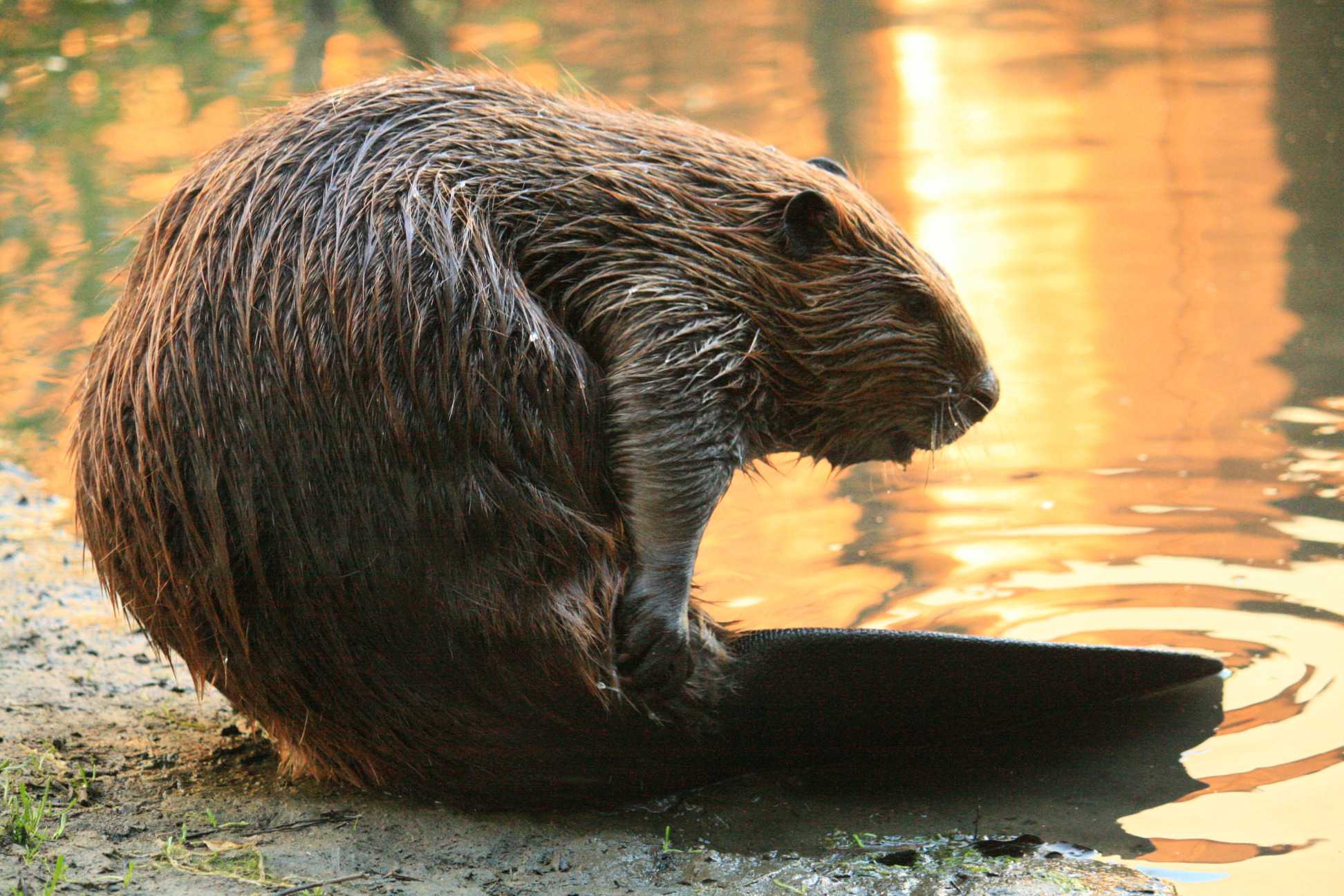
Yearling beaver in Alhambra Creek, downtown Martinez

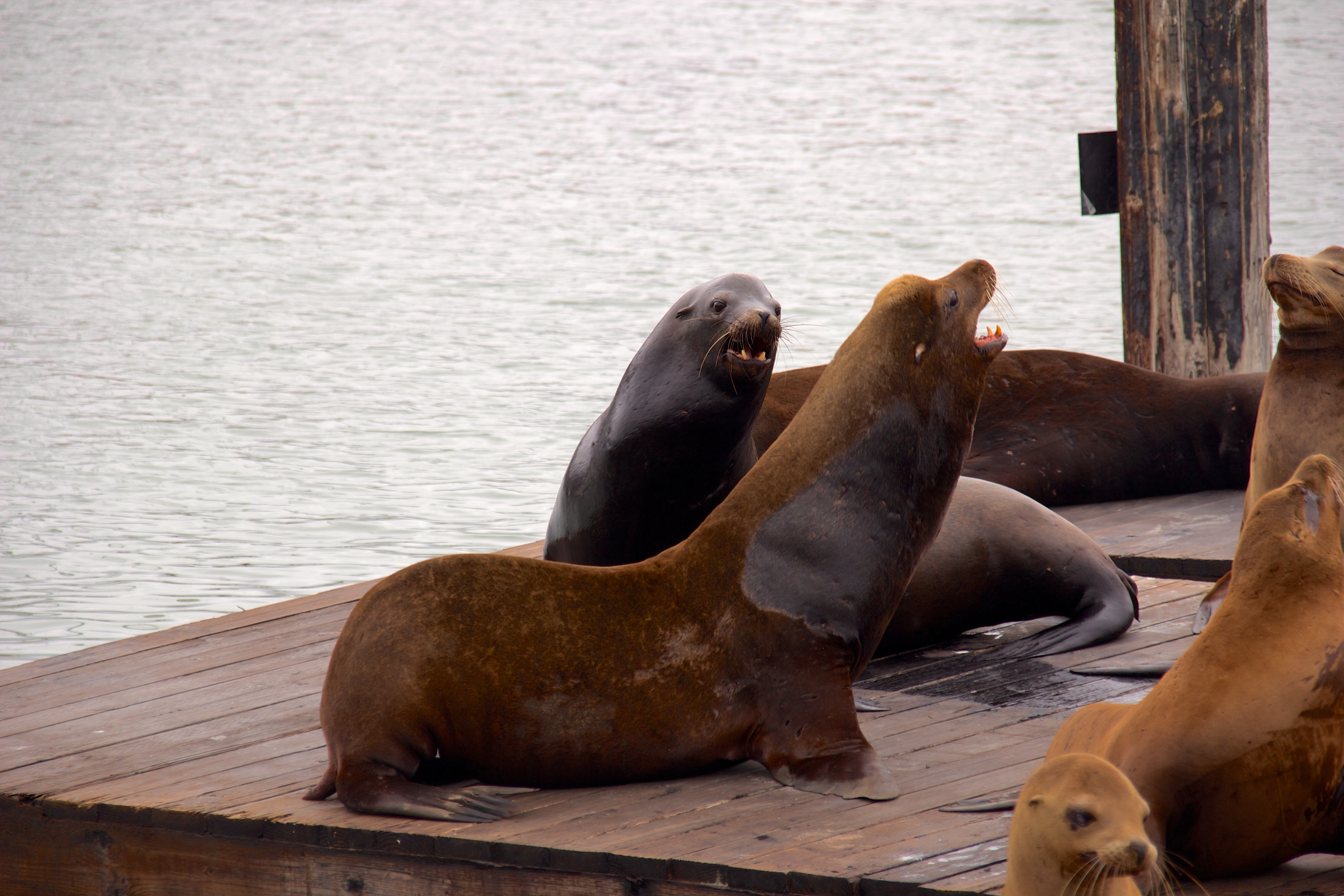
Sea Lions (Zalophus californianus) at Pier 39

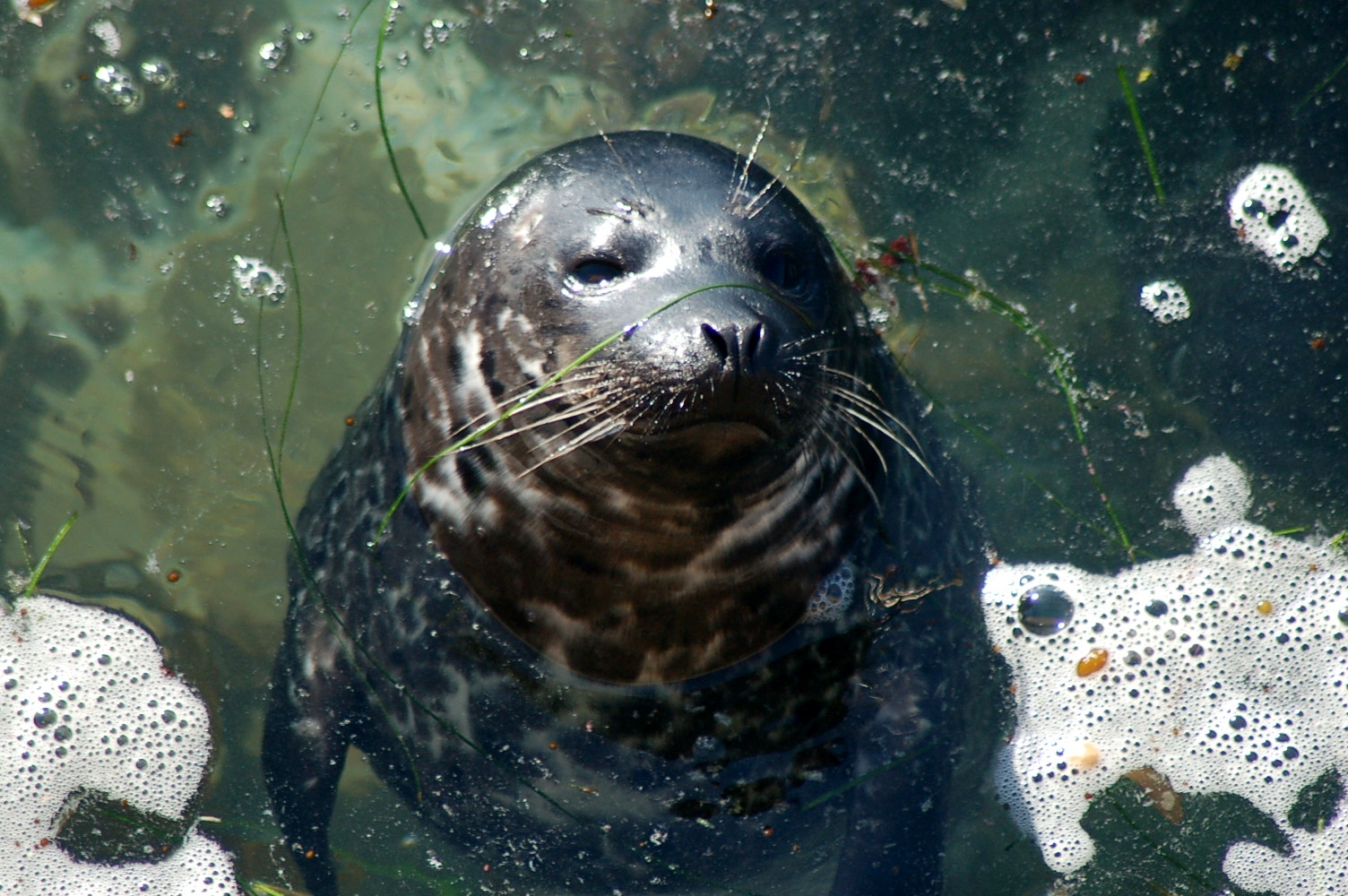
Pacific Harbor seal (Phoca vitulina richardii)

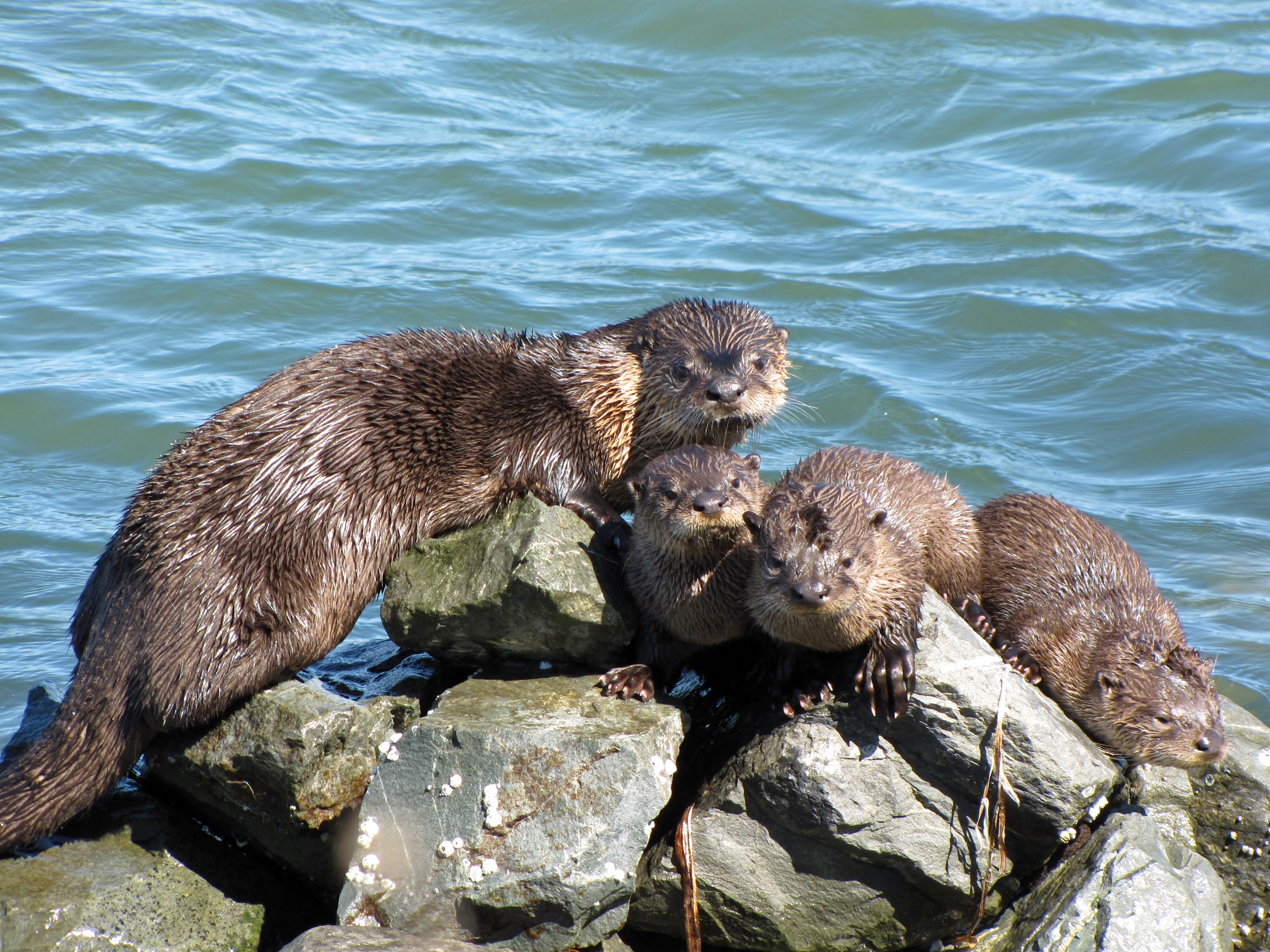
River otter sunning on rocks in the Richmond Marina

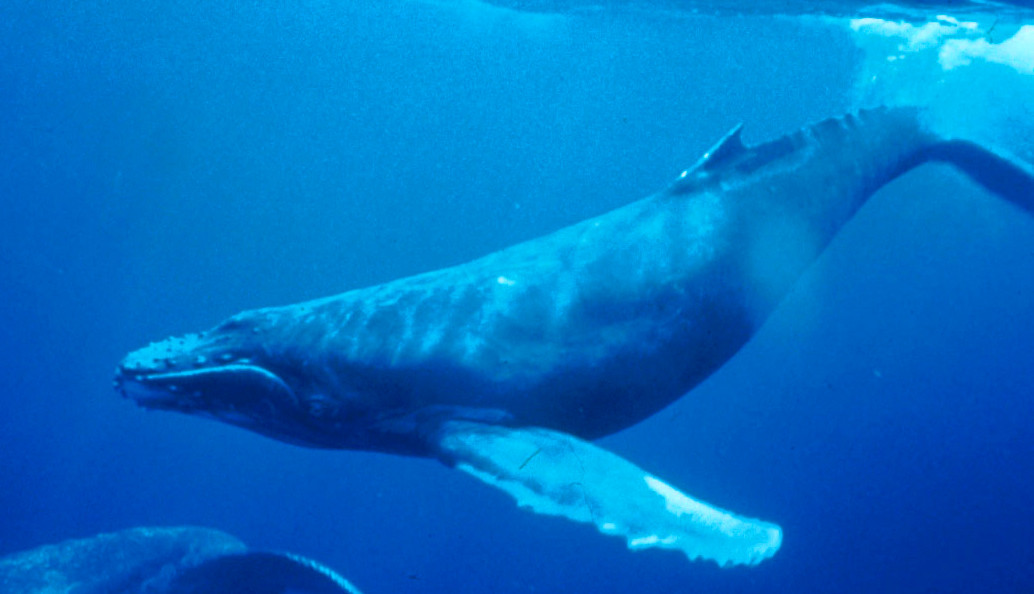
Humphrey the Whale a Humpback whale (Megaptera novaeangliae) that entered the bay

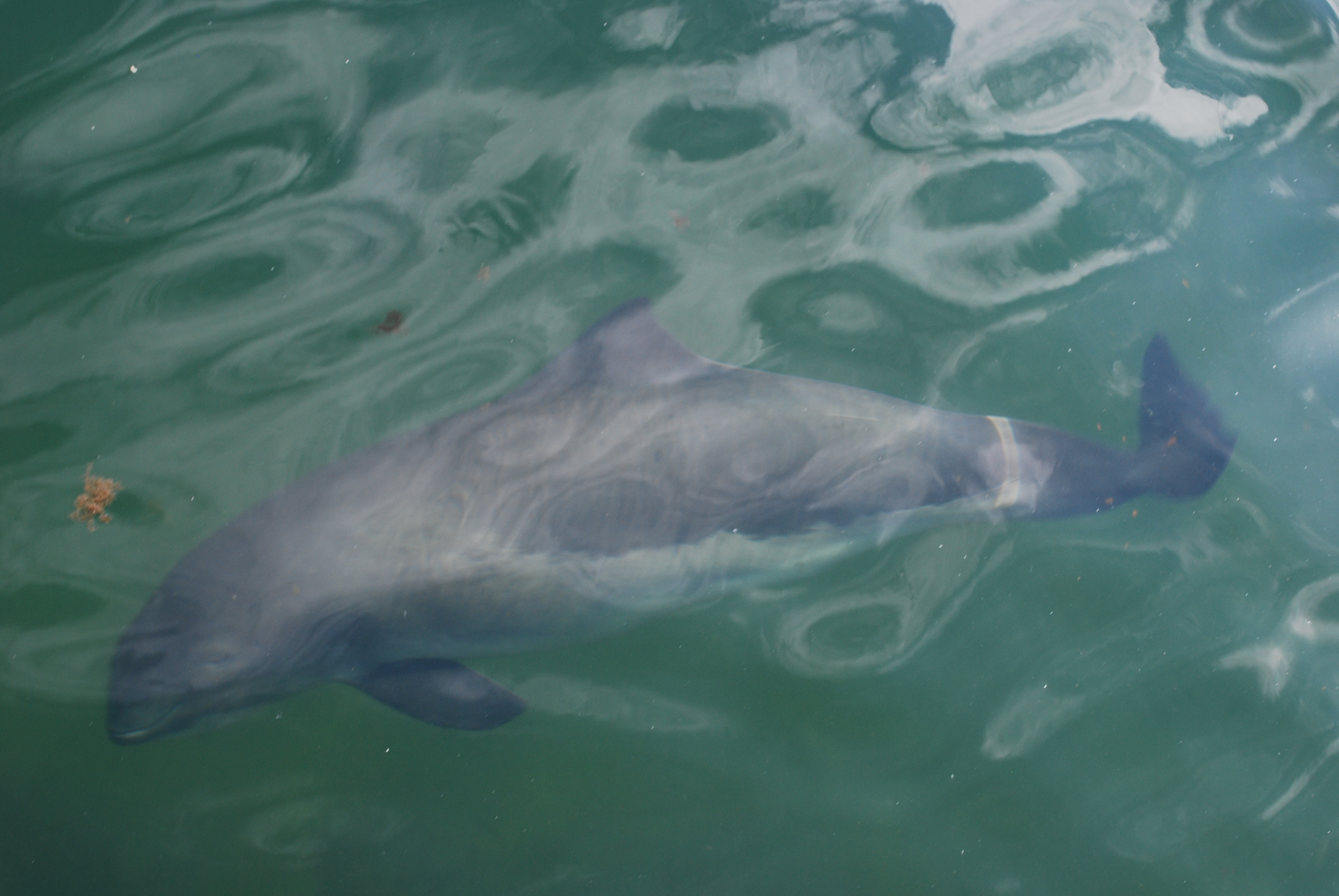
Harbour porpoise (Phocoena phocoena)

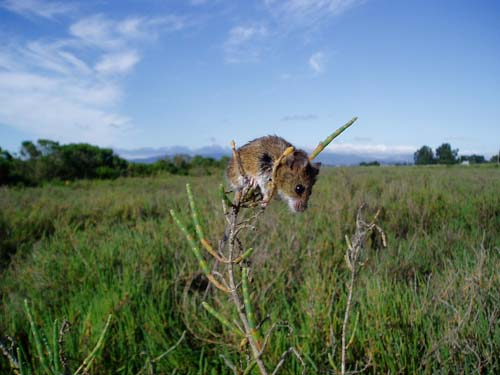
Salt marsh harvest mouse(Reithrodontomys raviventris), is an endangered species endemic to the wetlands of the San Francisco Bay with a high salt tolerance.

=== Jellyfish ===
Jellyfish have not been prevalent in the estuary until recently. In East Coast estuaries such as Chesapeake Bay, they are often top-level predators, feeding indiscriminately on both fish and zooplankton. Several small invasive taxa have been identified in the LSZ and freshwater regions. These species strobilate in summer, but maintain polyps in the benthos year round.

Their impact on the plankton is unknown, but research is underway to quantify it. In sufficient density, jellies may have a complementary role to C. amurensis in suppressing zooplankton, by inhabiting areas of low salinity outside the range of the clams, where planktonic species have had a predation-free refuge.

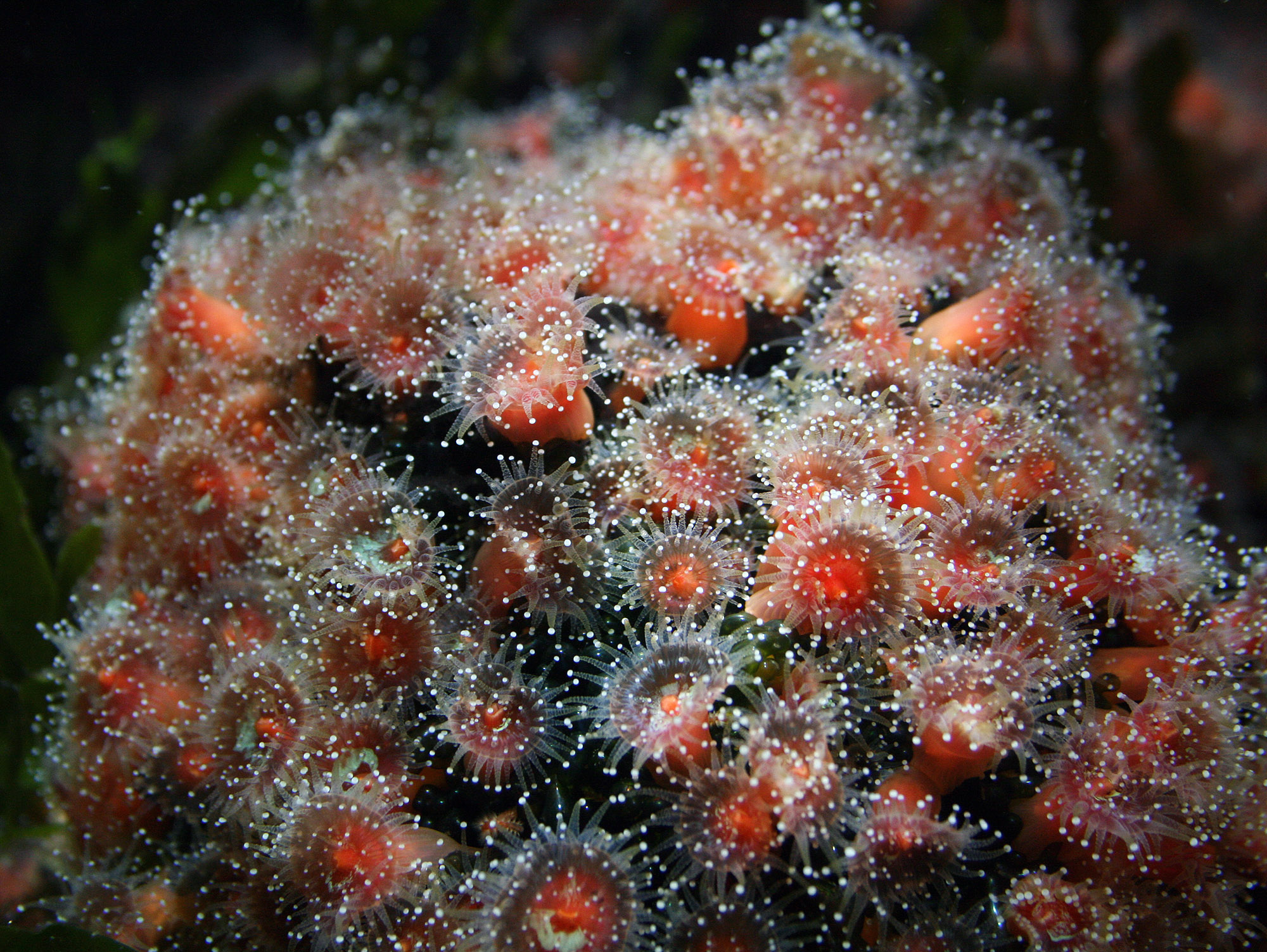
Corynactis californica found on docks and pilings in the intertidal zones

=== Benthic consumers ===
The benthic community has taken on a disproportionately large role in the food web ecology of the estuary due to key invasions by bivalves. The use of these clams, the Amur River clam (Corbula amurensis) has a wide salinity tolerance that extends into the low salinity zone, but not into freshwater. It filter feeds on phytoplankton and small zooplankton, such as calanoid copepod nauplii. The clam has few predators in the San Francisco Estuary and this allows it to grow to high densities (on the order of tens of thousands/m2). Because of its high clearance rates, it is capable of clearing the entire water column of portions of the estuary in a few days, leading to drastically depleted plankton populations. This is thought to be the main cause of a decline in ecosystem productivity after the invasion of the clams in the mid-1980s.

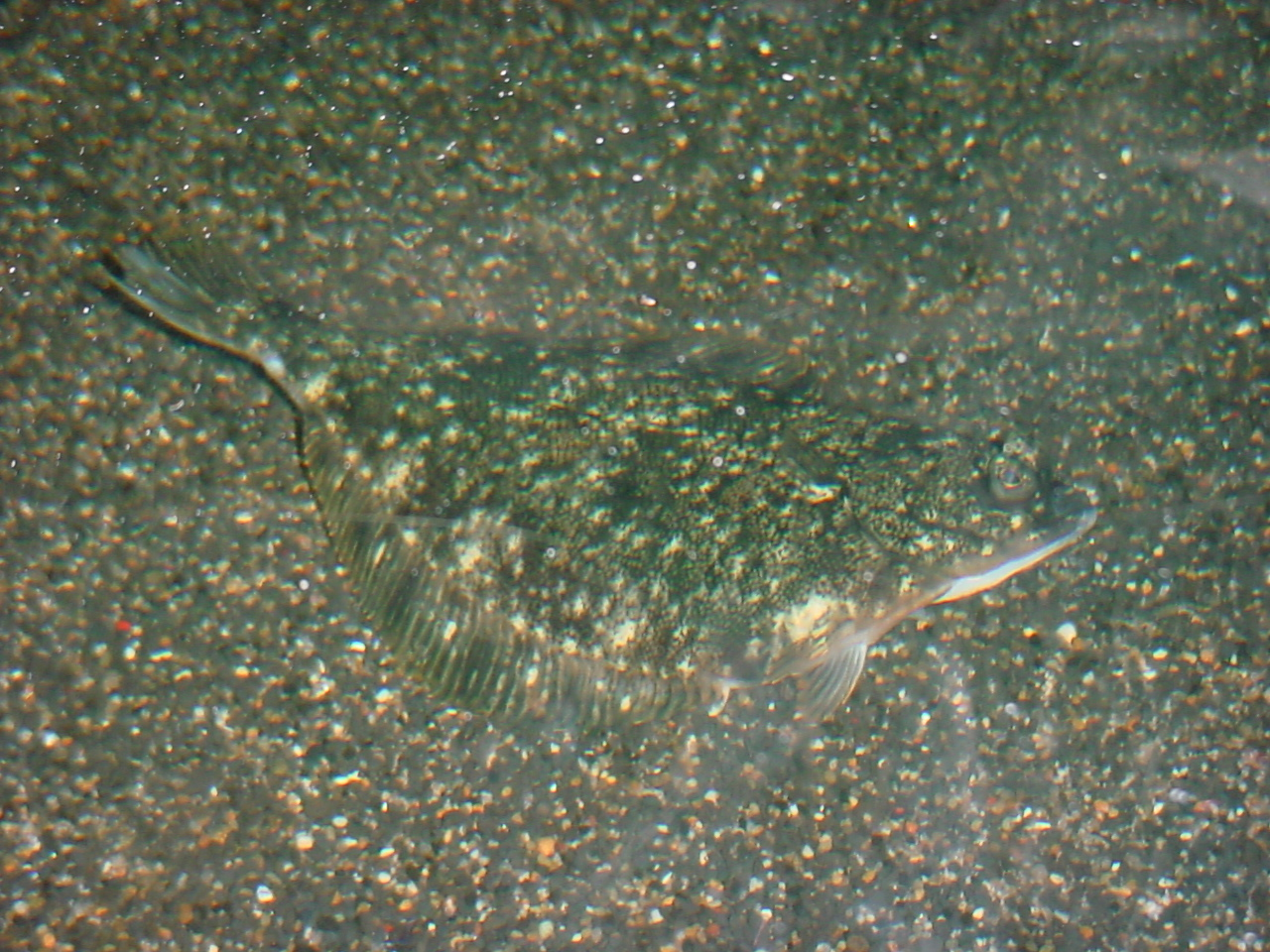
Starry flounder (Platichthys stellatus)

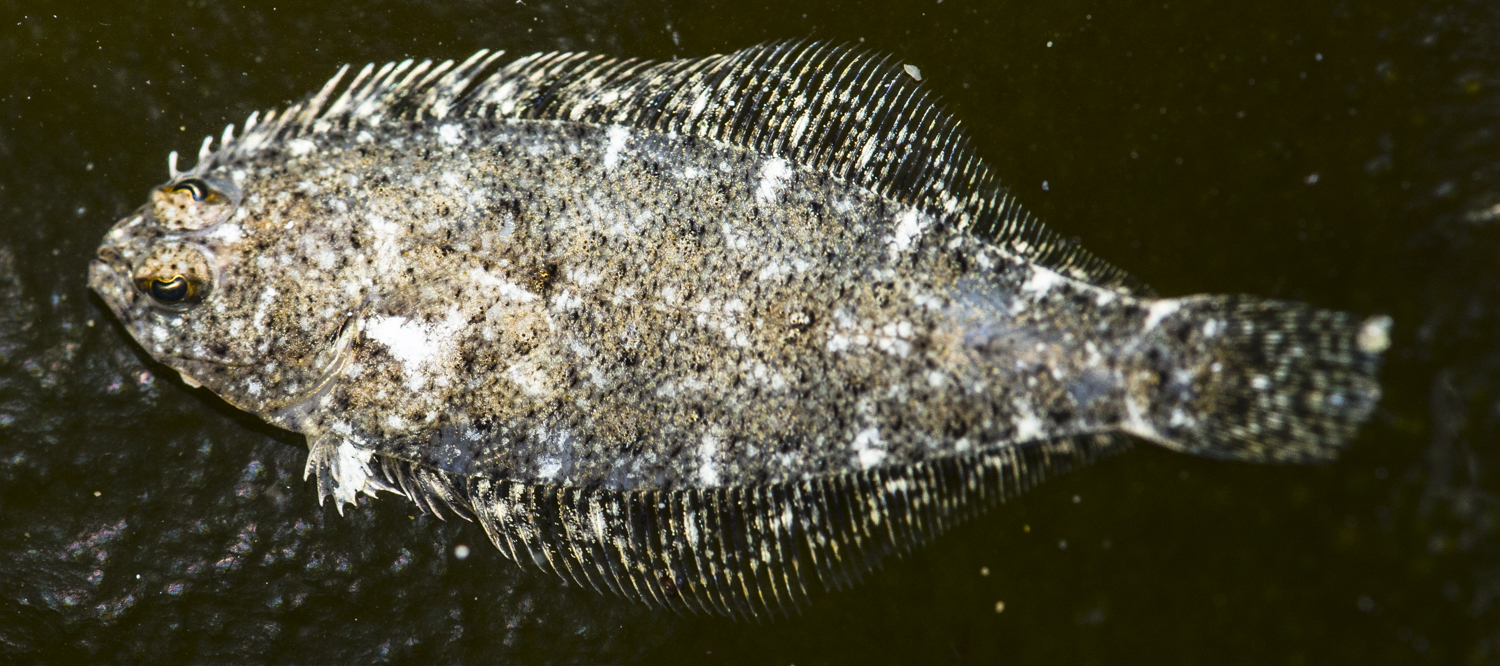
Speckled Sanddab (Citharichthys stigmaeus) found in subtidal zones with sandy bottoms

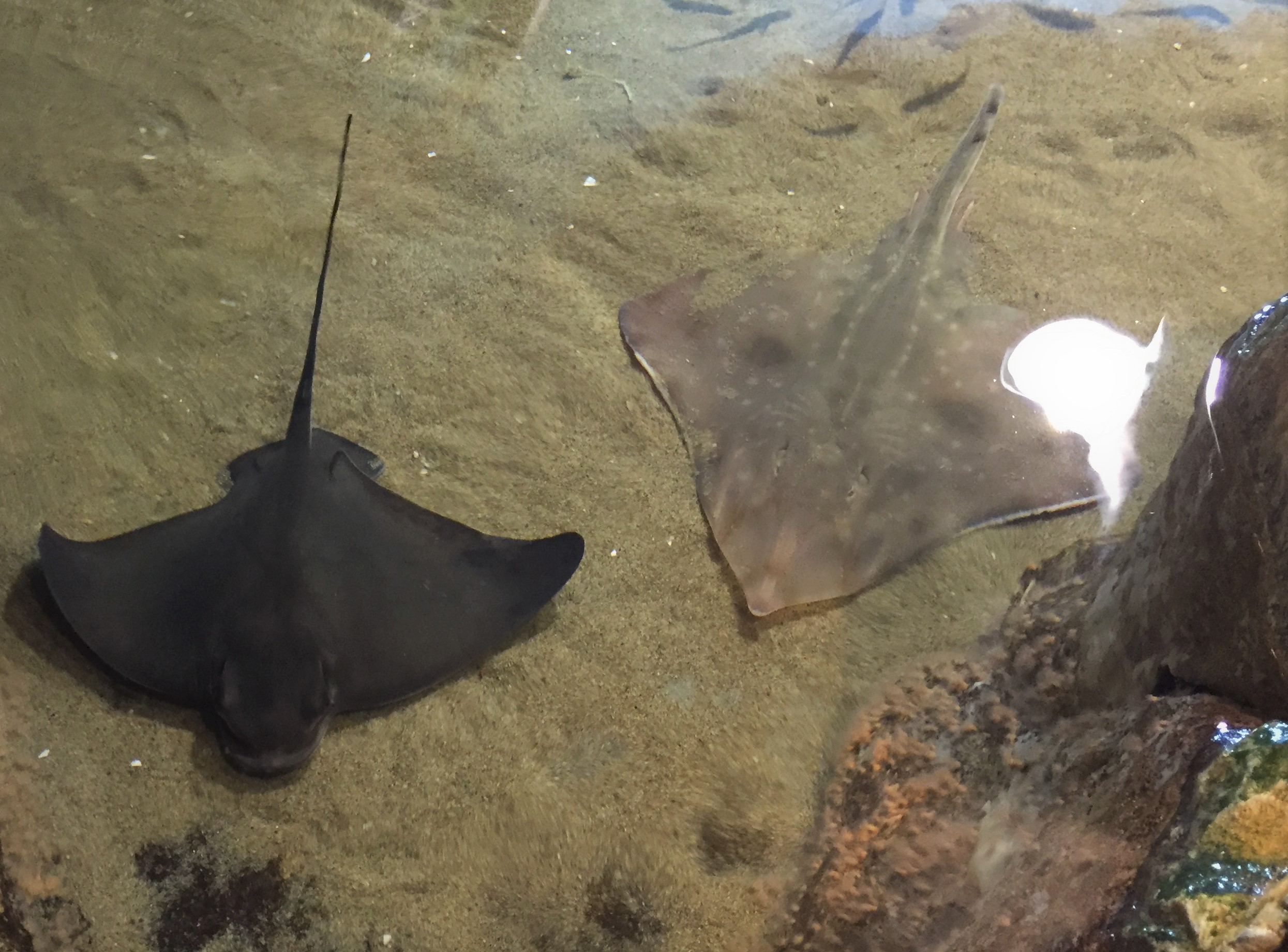
Bat Ray (Myliobatis californica) and a Big skate (Beringraja binoculata) in the Aquarium of the Bay both found in subtidal areas of the bay

This decline in productivity is essentially due to the redirection of the pelagic network to a benthic chain by this one species. Because the Amur River clam feeds on primary producers, consumers and predators, it impacts multiple trophic levels. Consequently, nearly all plankton exhibit signs of apparent competition, in that production at one trophic level impacts all others by increasing clam abundance. This results in a negative feedback loop: C. amurensis limits plankton biomass, which in turn limits C. amurensis. However, inputs from outside the system due to tidal advection or upstream sources may increase C. amurensis biomass, further driving plankton limitation. This feedback loop is further amplified because the clam may persist for more than one or two years, which puts added pressure on plankton populations during cycles of low productivity.

The redirection of carbon by C. amurensis to the benthos has created a limited chain, leaving the pelagic web depauperate. Detrital production from clam excretion and death may fuel bacterial production, which may be circulated into the detrital food web, or microbial loop.

While the recycled nutrients may support some phytoplankton growth, it ultimately feeds back to increased C. amurensis populations. The recent invasion success of Limnoithona tetraspina may be understood in terms of this phenomenon. It feeds on ciliates and microflagellates which are too small to be grazed by the clam, thereby avoiding competition. Additionally, L. tetraspina appears impervious to predation by the clam or (almost) anything else. The rise of the microbial food web and the invasion of L. tetraspina capitalize are the result of an untapped alternative path for energy flow in the food web, facilitated by C. amurensis. Subsequent patterns of invasion may reflect a similar pattern.

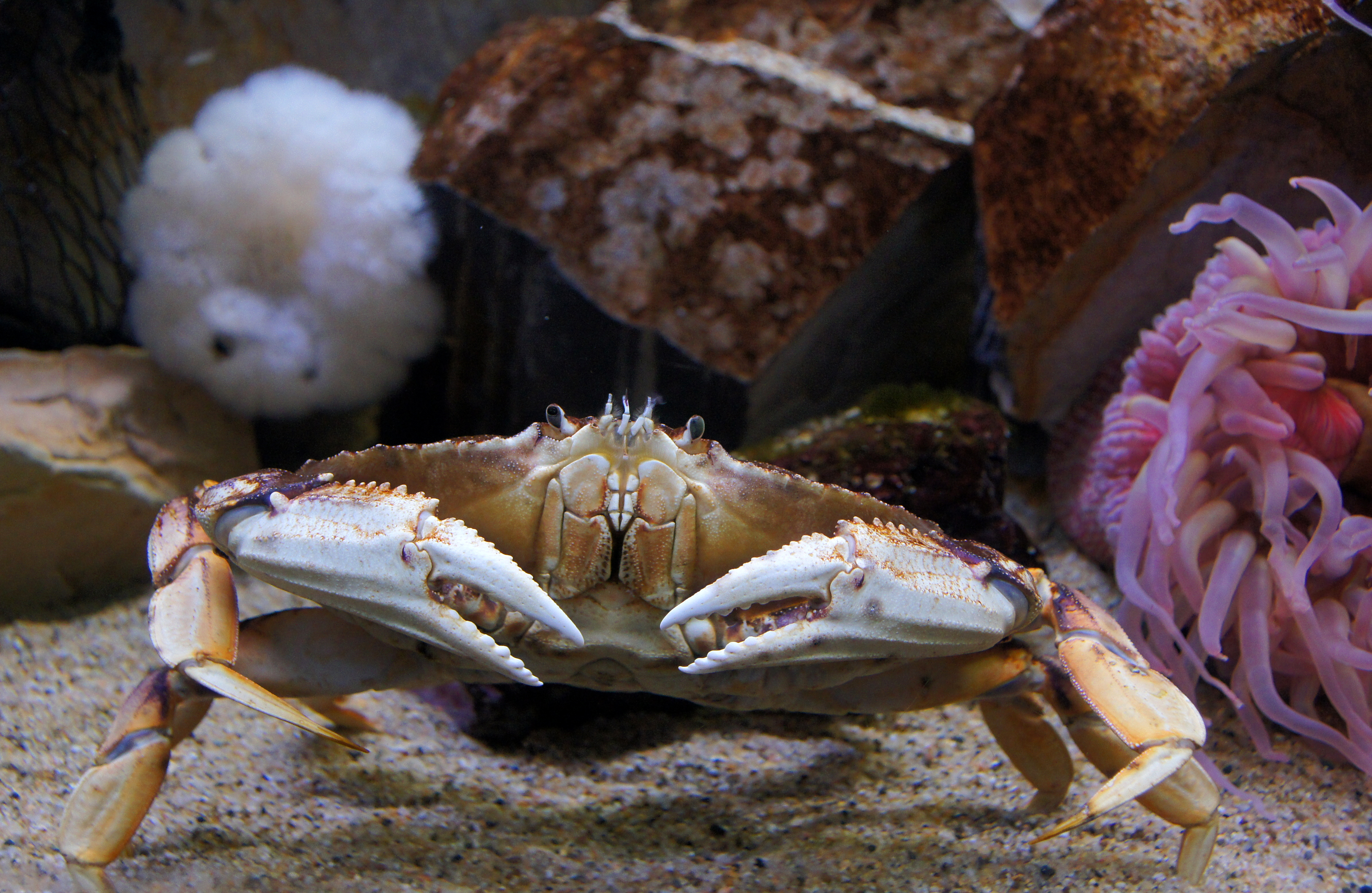
Dungeness Crab (Metacarcinus magister)

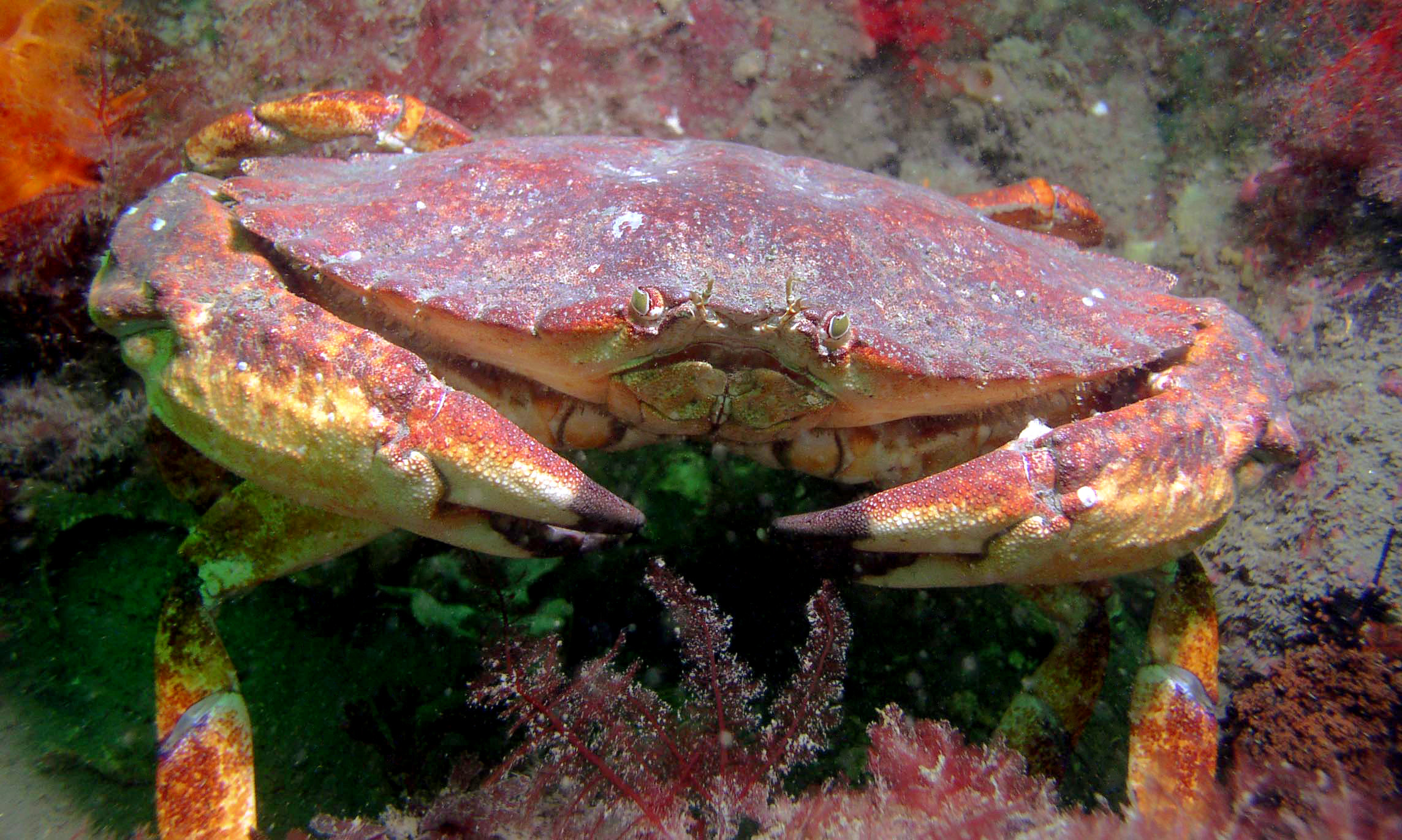
Red rock crab (Cancer productus)

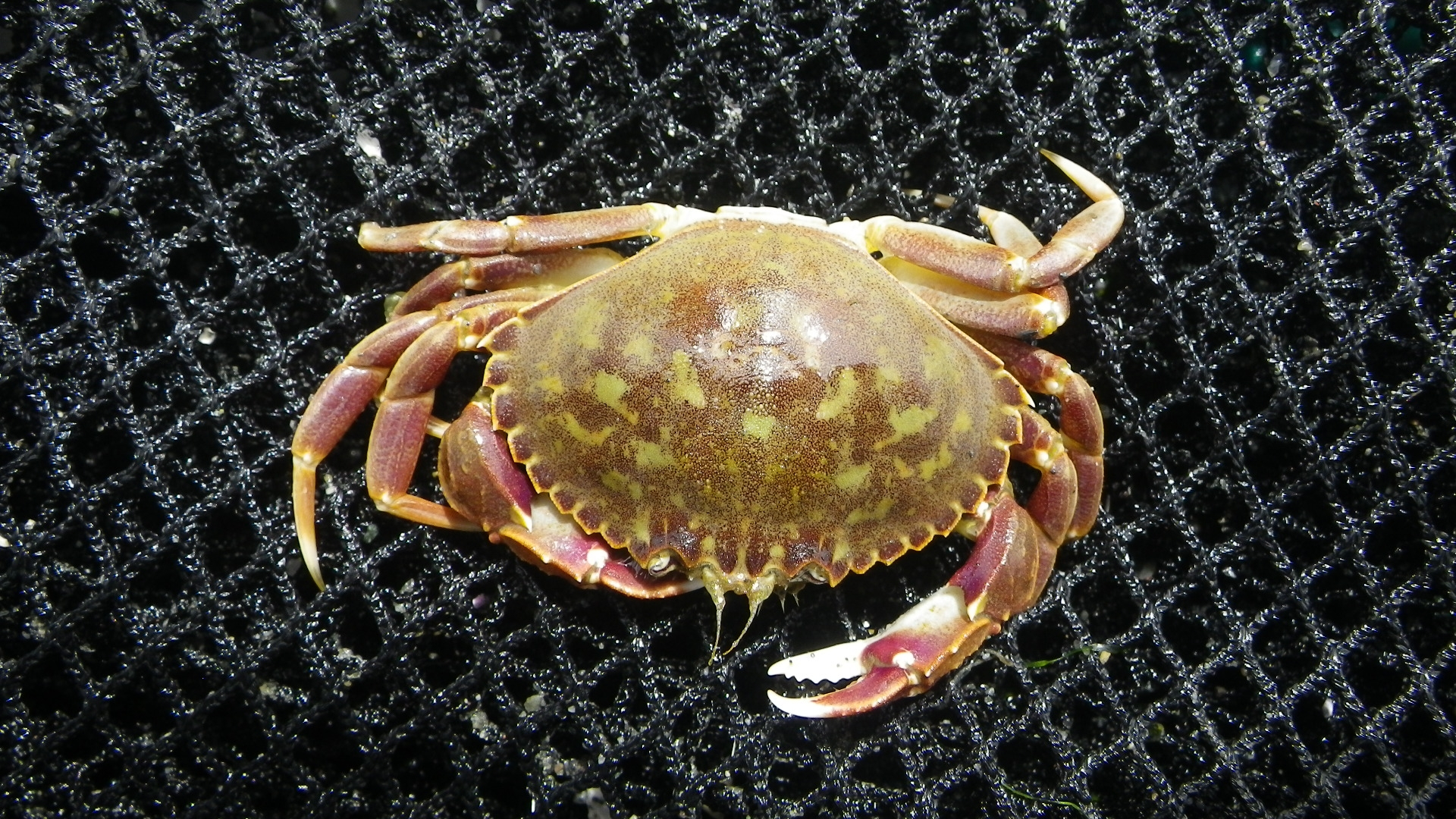
Graceful Crab (Metacarcinus gracilis)

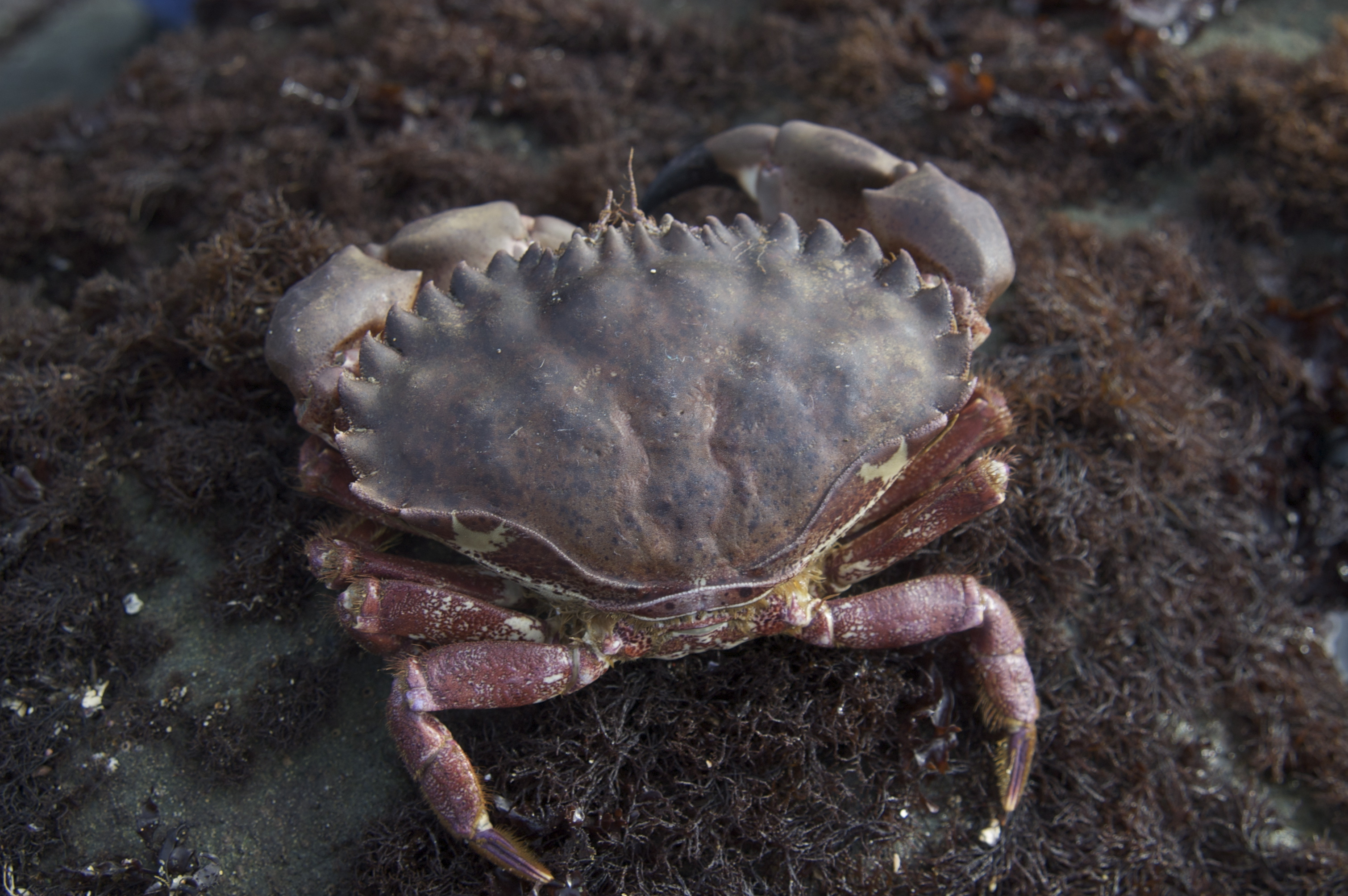
California rock crab(Romaleon antennarium)

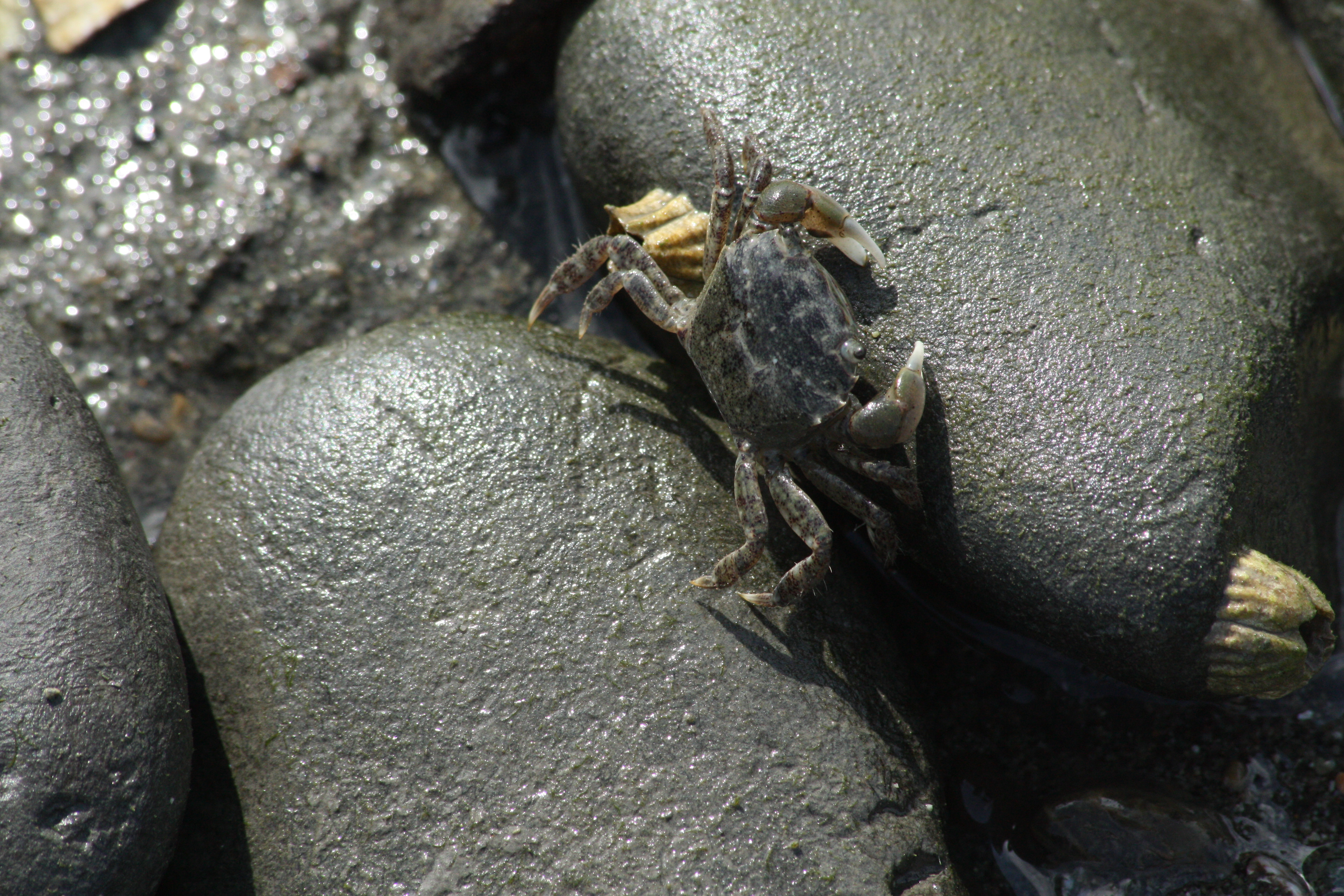
Yellow Shore crab (Hemigrapsus oregonensis) found in shallow intertidal areas

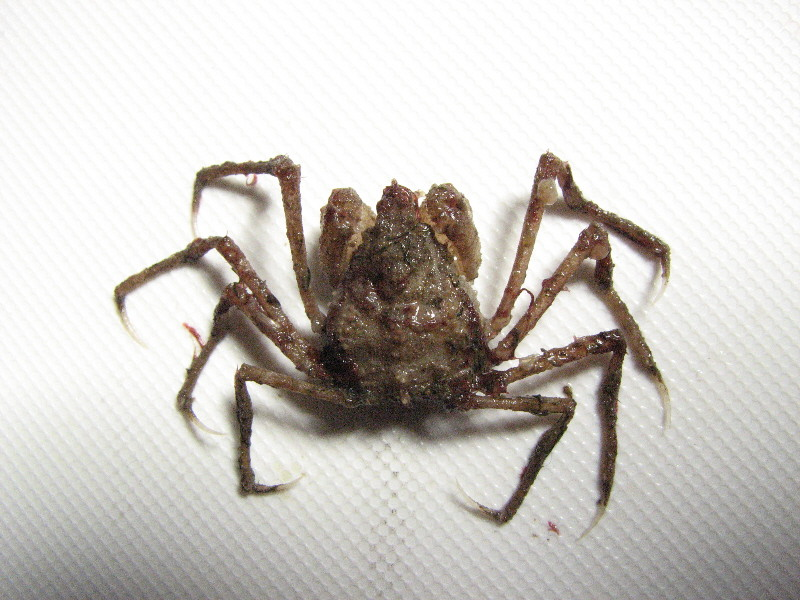
American spider crab (Pyromaia tuberculata) found under rocks and near dock pilings

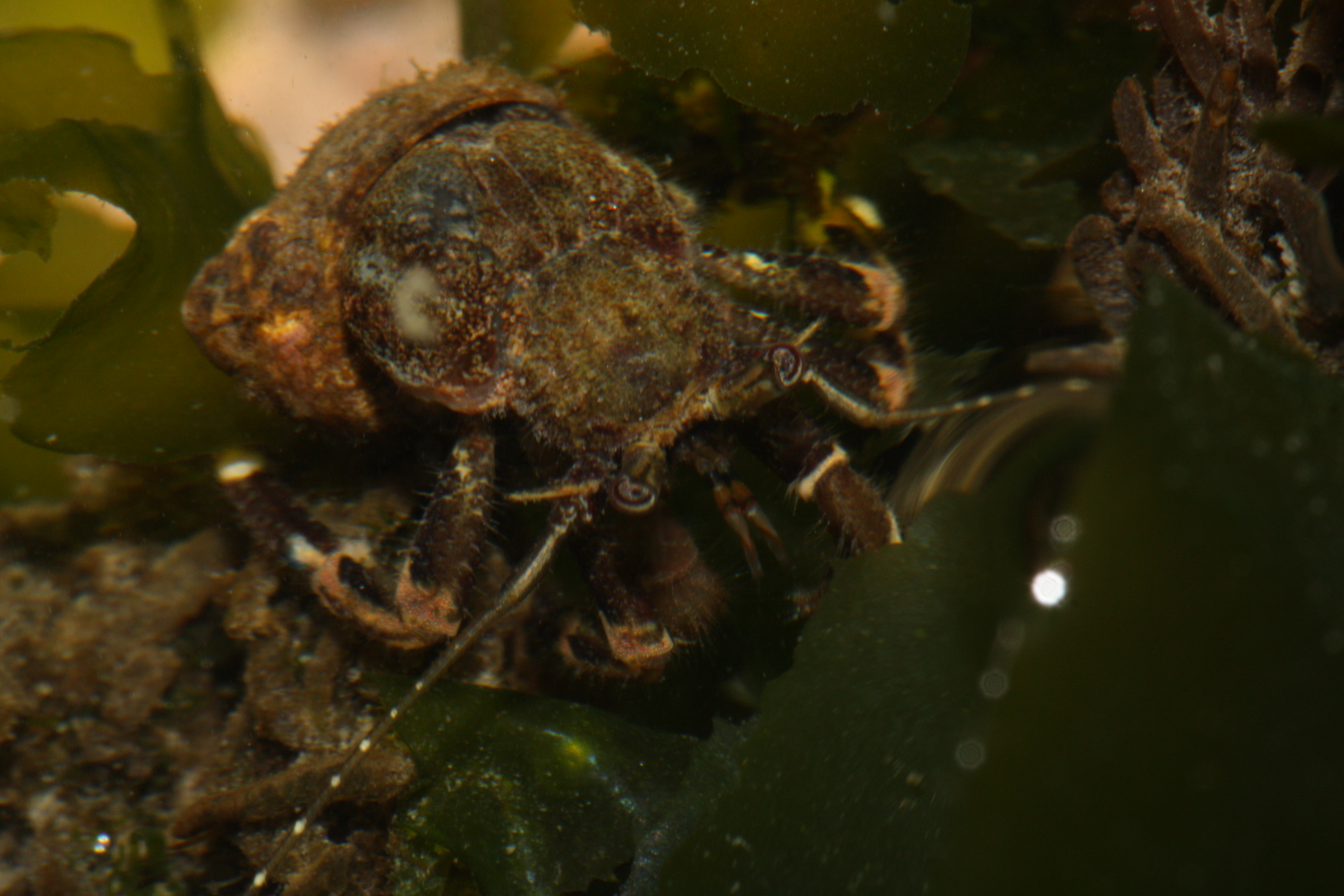
Hairy hermit crab(Pagurus hirsutiusculus)

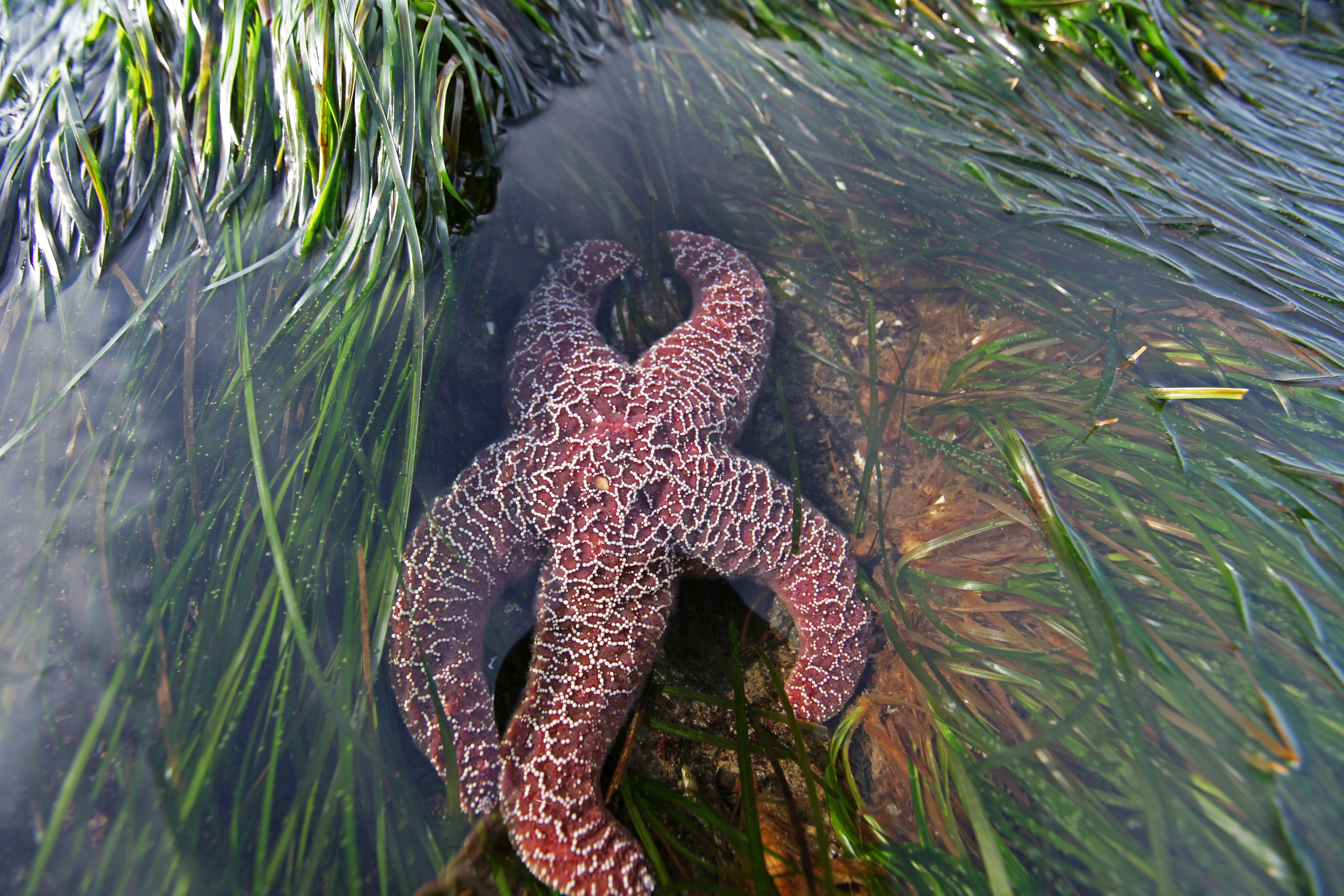
Ochre Starfish (Pisaster ochraceus) found in intertidal zone

== Introduced species ==
The striped bass is the main piscivore of the LSZ introduced in the 1890s.

Species introductions have been increasing since at least the 19th century as a function of increasing trade and traffic. Introductions include numerous taxa, including copepods, shrimp, amphipods, bivalves, fish and both rooted and floating plants. Many pelagic species have been introduced most recently through ballast water releases from large ships directly into the estuary. As a result, many of these introduced species originate from estuaries around the Pacific Rim, particularly copepods such as P. forbesi and L. tetraspina. The Amur River clam originates from Asia, and has created significant and drastic changes to the ecology of the LSZ, primarily by diverting pelagic food to the benthos and into an accelerated microbial loop.

Species have also been introduced via attachment to sporting boats which are trailered between regions. This is the probable source of a number of low salinity plants like Egeria densa and water hyacinth (Eichhornia crassipes). These plants have created profound changes in the Delta by disrupting water flow, shading phytoplankton, and providing habitat for piscivorous fish like the striped bass, Morone saxatilis, itself intentionally introduced in the late 1800s from the Chesapeake Bay. The freshwater quagga mussel, originally from Europe, is expected to be introduced by boaters within the next two to ten years, in spite of precautionary measures. Furthermore, the young age and isolated environment of the San Francisco estuary has resulted in the success of invasive invertebrates due to the lack of biodiversity.

=== Future invasions ===
The modern food web is derived from a series of invasions and trophic substitutions.

This process is expected to continue, as new organisms arrive through accidental or intentional introductions. What is less clear is the extent to which previous introductions pave the way for future invasions. This may occur in one of three ways.

- An early invader may provide a resource that is unutilized in the new system until a new predator is introduced (L. tetraspina and the microbial loop, as described above).
- Early invaders may facilitate new ones by altering habitat and making it suitable for subsequent invasions (jelly polyps using Amur River clam shells for substrate).
- Apparent competition between old and new residents may increase the possibilities for invasion and settlement of new organisms that can capitalize on unexploited resources (the subsidization of the Amur River clam by upstream populations of the introduced copepod P. forbesi, creating pressure on native copepods).

== Summary ==
The LSZ food web of the San Francisco Estuary operates in two parallel and asymmetrical directions. The bulk of carbon is assimilated into the benthic and microbial loops, which represent energetic dead ends. A smaller fraction is delivered to higher pelagic trophic levels which may support copepods, fish, birds and fisheries. This redirection of the food web into these two narrow loops may be responsible for the decline in macroinvertebrates and fishes in the estuary, which operate outside of these chains. Restoration of the estuary to a higher degree of function relies upon the probability of delivering increased benefits to the pelagic web without subsidizing the benthic.

== Future ecology ==
The ecology of the Low Salinity Zone of the San Francisco Estuary is difficult to characterize because it is the result of a complex synergy of both abiotic and biotic factors. In addition, it continues to undergo rapid change resulting from newly introduced species, direct anthropogenic influences and climate change. Future ecological changes will be driven on an ecosystem wide scale, particularly as sea level rise, tectonic instability and infrastructure decline cause levee failure in the Delta. The resulting back-surge in water flow is expected to force X2 into the Delta, jeopardizing spatially oriented habitat (like freshwater marshes), channelizing the low salinity zone, and threatening southern California's water supply, with unknown and unforeseeable consequences for the natural and human ecology of the West coast's largest estuary.

== See also ==
- List of watercourses in the San Francisco Bay Area
- Hydrography of the San Francisco Bay Area
- The Watershed Project
- San Francisco Estuary and Watershed Science
