= California fur rush =

History of 19th-century fur hunting in California

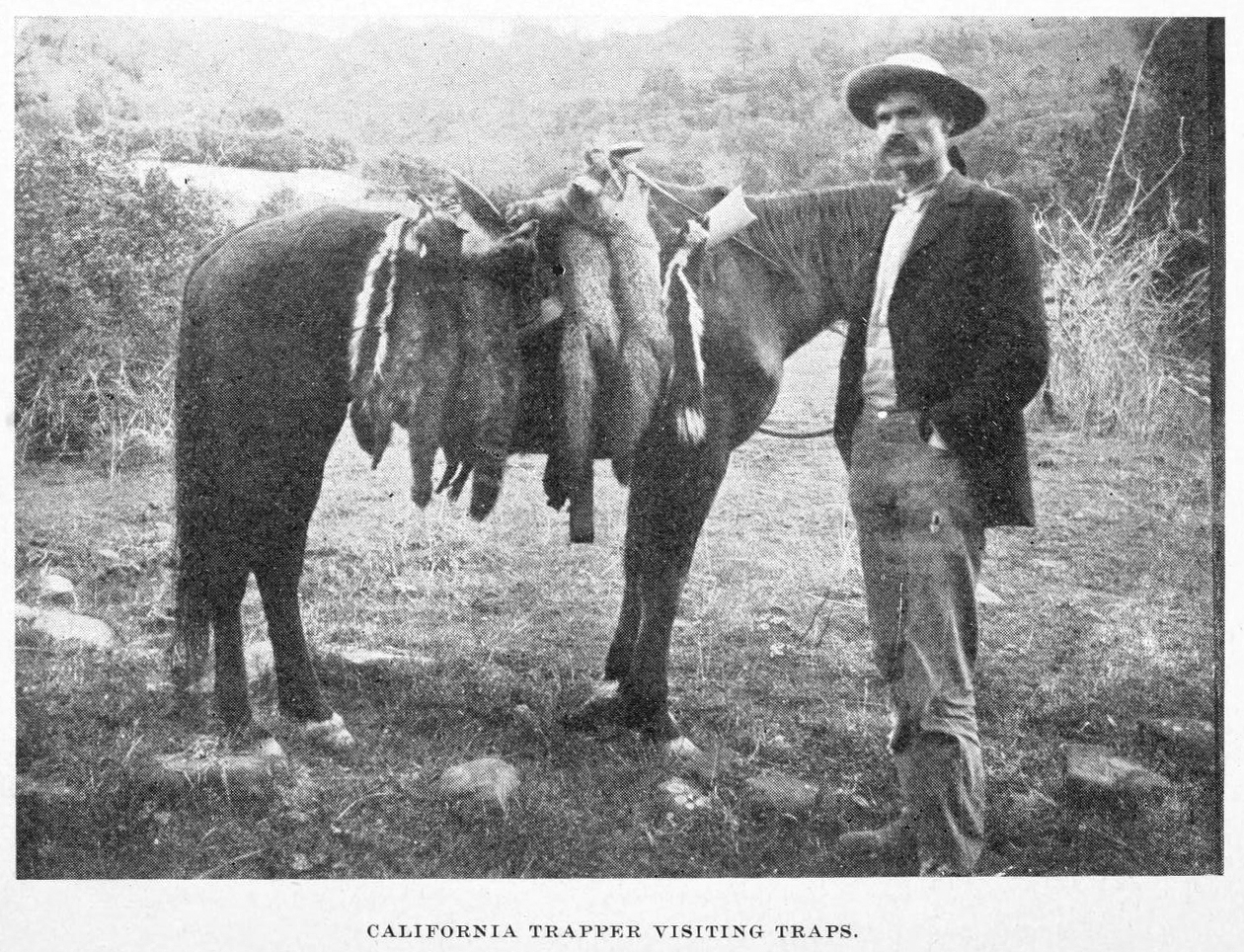
A California fur trapper with his pelts

Before the 1849 California gold rush, American, English, and Russian fur hunters were drawn to Spanish (and then Mexican) California in a California fur rush, to exploit its enormous fur resources. Before 1825, these Europeans were drawn to the northern and central California coast to harvest prodigious quantities of southern sea otter (Enhydra lutris nereis) and fur seals (Callorhinus ursinus), and then to the San Francisco Bay Area and Sacramento – San Joaquin River Delta to harvest beaver (Castor canadensis), river otter (Lontra canadensis), marten, fisher, mink, gray fox furs (Urocyon cinereoargenteus), weasel, and harbor seal. It was California's early fur trade, more than any other single factor, that opened up the West, and the San Francisco Bay Area in particular, to world trade.

The massive increase of hunting and trapping in the 19th century caused the near extinction of many species in the state by 1911, including the California golden beaver and California sea otter.

== Coastal or maritime fur trade ==
Captain James Cook's portrait

The earliest record of fur being traded with Europeans in California was in 1733 of Spanish missionaries trading with tribes in upper and lower California for sea otter pelts.

Just three years after Juan de Ayala sailed the first ship to pass through the Golden Gate in 1775, North America's Pacific Coast fur trade began, but not by the Spanish who had sailed the California coast since João Rodrigues Cabrilho's voyage in 1542 and Sebastián Vizcaíno's mapping of coastal California in 1602. It began in 1778 with Captain James Cook's third voyage, when otter skins were obtained at Nootka Sound on the Northwest Coast and, although Cook was killed in Hawaii on the way to China, his men were shocked at the high prices paid by the Chinese. A profit of 1,800% was made. In 1783, when John Ledyard reported in Connecticut that enormous profits could be made selling otter skins to China, New England began sending American ships to hunt sea otter, and later, beaver, on the Pacific coast as early as 1787. That the California fur trade had begun by 1785, just ten years after Ayala landed in San Francisco Bay, is evidenced by the Spanish issuance of regulations to govern the collection of otter skins in California. The west coast fur trade enabled New England merchants to recover from the economic collapse which followed the American Revolutionary War, and was exacerbated by closure of British home and colonial ports to American trade.

France sent La Pérouse to California in 1786 to investigate the fur trade opportunity and he "obtained about a thousand sea otter skins which he sold in China for ten thousand dollars" and shared that "The Indians...at Monterey...catch them on land with snares...". La Perouse also said that "Antecedent to this year (1786) an otter's skin bore no higher value than two hare's skins; the Spanish never suspected that they would be much sought after." Apparently the Spanish had not earlier appreciated the value of furs, being from warmer climes, despite sea otter described in 1776 off Fort Point (then Cantil Blanco) in San Francisco Bay by Father Pedro Font on the De Anza Expedition. Font wrote, "I beheld a prodigy of nature, which is not easy to describe.... We saw the spouting of young whales, a line of dolphins or tunas, besides seals and otters..." However, they mounted a major commercial otter hunting enterprise in California when Vicente Vasadre y Vega arrived just one month before La Perouse, and implemented a plan whereby all otter skins had to be sold to him and they quickly recruited the Christian Indians at the Missions to bring in pelts. Vasadre sailed to San Blas on November 28, 1786 with 1,060 otter skins, to be shipped to the Philippines on the Manila galleons.

Robert Gray, captain of the ship Columbia rediscovered the mouth of the Columbia River in 1792 on his second voyage to the Pacific Coast. Although the Spanish explorer Bruno de Heceta came to the river's mouth in 1775, no other explorer or fur trader had been able to find it since. By the 1790s American ships dominated the coastal fur trade south of Russian America. In fact, Bostonian ships dominated the fur trade between California and China through the 1820s, when the sea otter supply was exhausted, and well before the first American mountain man, Jedediah Smith pioneered overland to California in pursuit of beaver pelts in 1826.

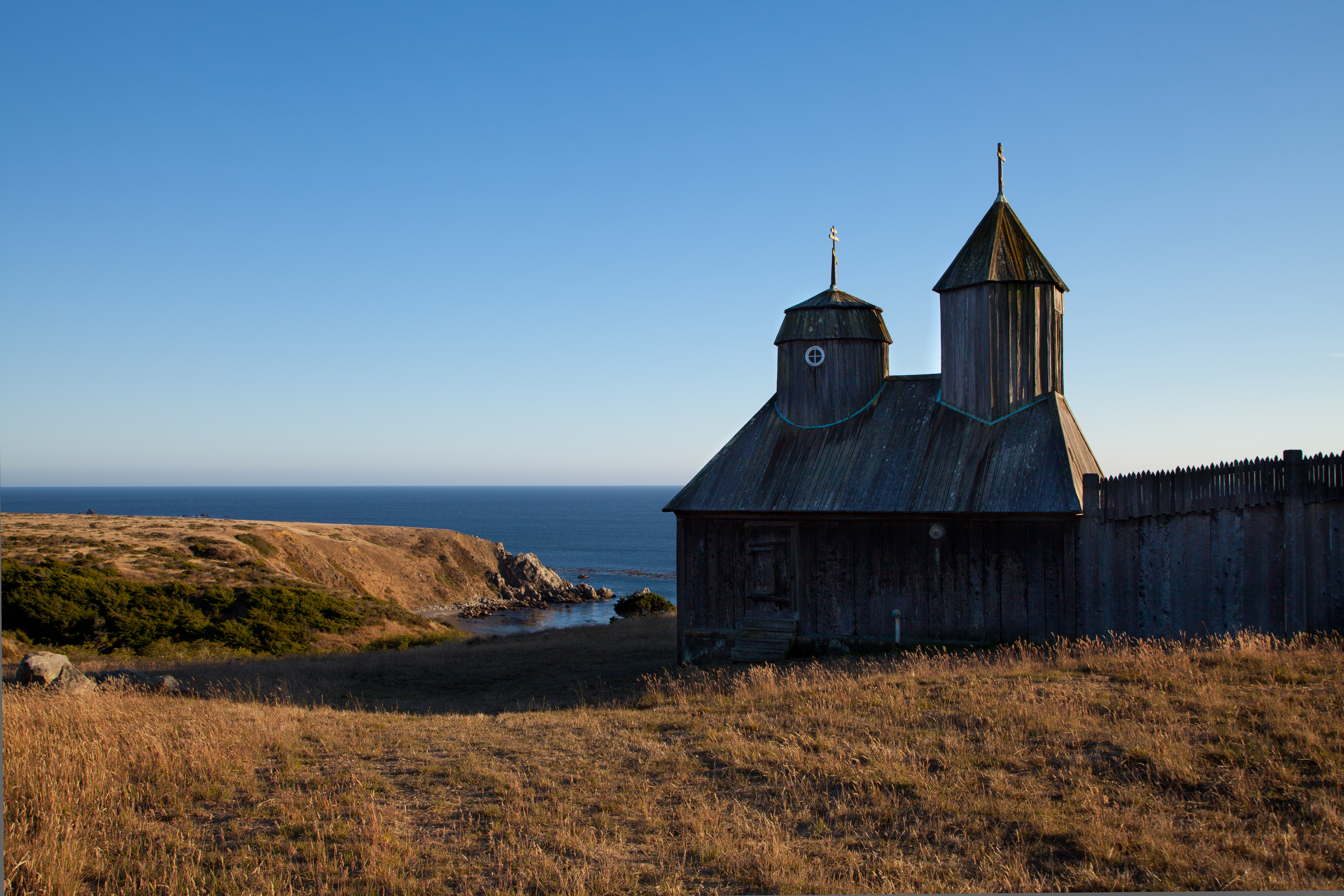
Fort Ross, Russian-American Company settlement and trading post

The Russian-American Company's Ivan Kuskov sailed into Bodega Bay in 1809 on the Kad'yak and returned to Novoarkhangelsk (Sitka) with beaver skins and over 2,000 sea otter pelts. They settled Fort Ross and vicinity in order to pursue the animals in the region and to provide food for their Alaskan settlements. In his 1896 history of the Russian settlement of California, Thompson wrote of Kuskov's first voyage to Bodega Bay in 1809: "After carefully exploring the surrounding country, some temporary buildings were erected, some otter and beaver skins were procured, and friendly relations were established with the Indians". Before establishing a southern colony at Fort Ross, the Russian-American Company contracted with American ships beginning in 1810, providing them with Aleuts and baidarkas (kayaks) to hunt otter on the coast of Spanish California. From 1810 to 1812, Americans contracted to the Russians snuck Aleuts into San Francisco Bay multiple times, despite the Spanish capturing or shooting them while hunting sea otters in the estuaries of San Jose, San Mateo, and San Bruno and around Angel Island. Kuskov, this time in the schooner Chirikov, returned to Bodega Bay in 1812; finding otter now scarce, he sent a party of Aleuts to San Francisco Bay where they met another Russian party and an American party and caught 1,160 sea otters in three months. By 1817, sea otters in the area were practically eliminated and the Russians sought permission from the Spanish and the Mexican governments to hunt further and further south of San Francisco. In 1824, Russian-American Fur Company agent and writer Kiril Timofeevich Khlebnikov contracted with Captain John Cooper to take several of their hunting baidarkas on his trading schooner Rover along with Aleut hunters to hunt sea otter as far south as the 30th parallel on the Baja California peninsula.

The American ships Albatross under Nathan Winship O'Cain under his brother Jonathan Winship were sent from Boston in 1809 to establish a settlement on the Columbia River. In 1810, they met up with two other American ships at the Farallon Islands, the Mercury and the Isabella, and at least 30,000 seal skins were taken. By 1822, the Farallons' fur seal hunt had diminished to 1,200 annually and the Russians suspended the hunt for two years. Although American ships had already exploited the islands, the Russians maintained a sealing station in the Farallon Islands from 1812 to 1840, taking 1,200 to 1,500 fur seals annually. From 1824 on, the subsequent catch continued a steady decline until only about 500 could be taken annually; within the next few years, the seal was extirpated from the islands.

The California fur trade ended as fur-bearers of all kinds were depleted in the first half of the nineteenth century. Hudson's Bay Company fur trapper Michel Laframboise arrived in San Francisco Bay in October 1832 and visited Mission San. Francisco, Mission San Jose, Mission San Francisco Solano, and Mission San Rafael, and stated that "the Bay of San Francisco abounds in beaver"..and that he made his best hunts "in the vicinity of the missions." - although it is unclear whether he meant beaver or sea otter as both were present. After sailing up and down the California coast, Richard Henry Dana recorded on May 8, 1836 at his last stop in San Diego how the trade in cattle hides had overtaken the fur trade: "Our forty thousand [cattle] hides and thirty thousand horns, besides several barrels of otter and beaver skins, were all stowed below, and the hatches calked down." As the marine fur-bearers became too depleted to hunt and contracts with the Hudson's Bay Company provided food for the Alaskan settlements, the Russians abandoned Fort Ross in 1841.

By the end of the 19th century, California sea otters had been hunted to near extinction. The US government began to manage sea otter as a valuable natural resource in 1911. However, due to the previous two centuries of unregulated exploitation of the species, it was uncertain whether they would be able to revive the population.

== California fur-bearers today ==
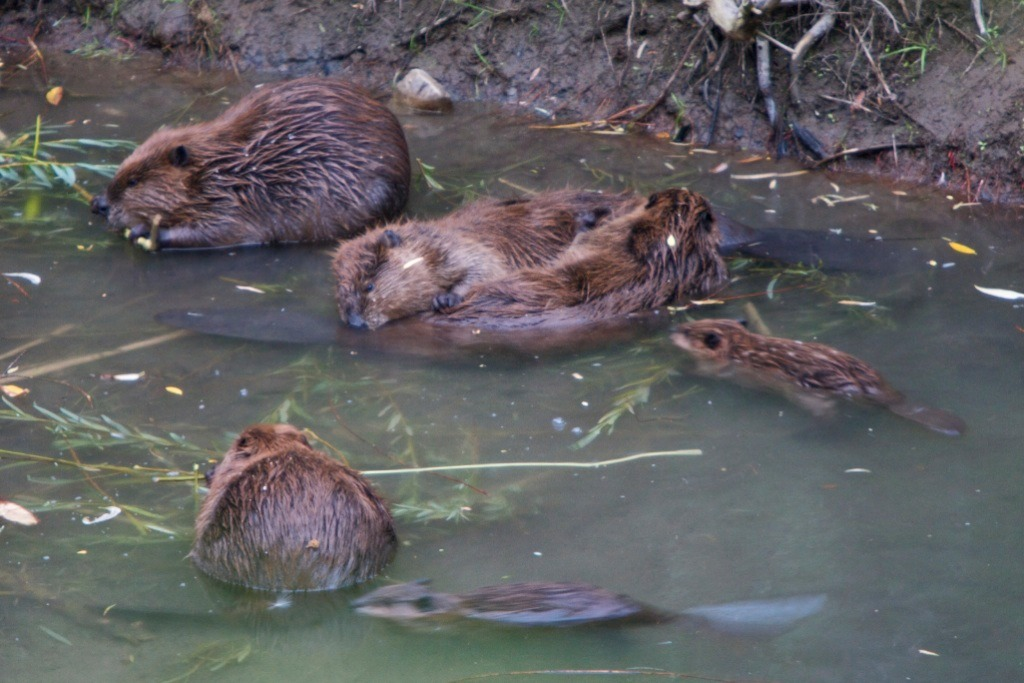
California golden beaver family on upper Los Gatos Creek

In 2019, California State Legislature passed a bill banning the manufacturing, import, and sale of new fur products in the state. The law went into effect beginning January 1, 2023.

California golden beaver are recolonizing the Bay Area by traversing north San Francisco Bay (from east to west) : Kirker Creek in the Dow Wetlands of Pittsburg, Fairfield Creek in Cordelia, Alhambra Creek in Martinez, Southampton Creek in Benicia State Recreation Area, the Napa Sonoma Marsh in north San Pablo Bay, the Napa River, and Sonoma Creek. These beaver likely emigrated from the Delta which once sustained the densest beaver populations in North America. In addition, beaver were re-introduced in the 1930s by the California Department of Fish and Game to Pescadero Creek and sometime before 1993 in Lexington Reservoir in the south San Francisco Bay area, where they have colonized Los Gatos Creek, then the Guadalupe River, and then traversed the south Bay to colonize Coyote Creek in East San Jose and up to Matadero Creek in Palo Alto.

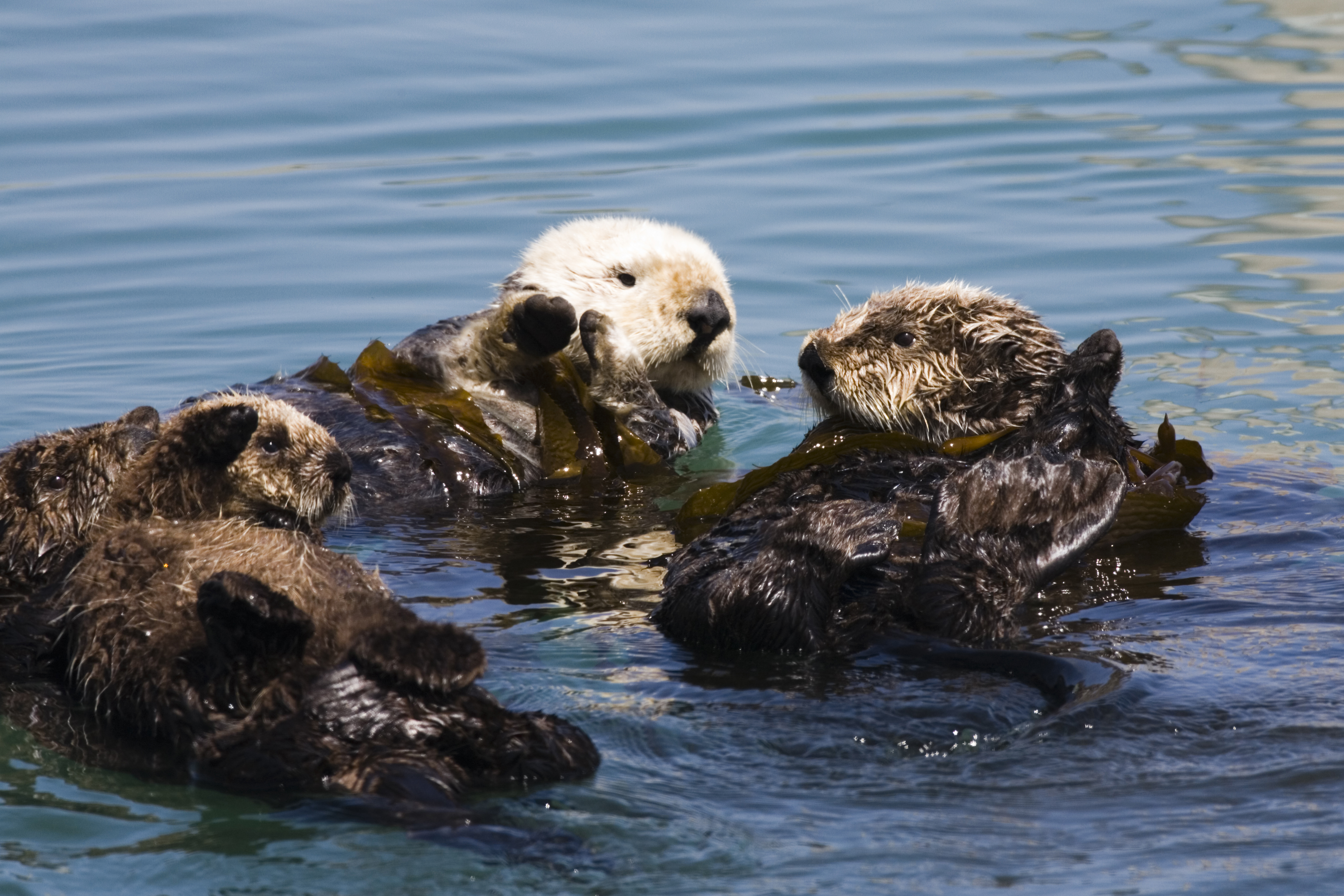
A group of four California sea otters

The spring 2019 sea otter survey counted 2,962 sea otters in the central California coast, down from an estimated pre-fur trade population of 16,000. California's sea otters are the descendants of a single colony of about 50 southern sea otters discovered near the mouth of Bixby Creek along California's Big Sur coast in 1938; their principal range is now from just south of San Francisco to Santa Barbara County. The US Geological Survey reports that the 5 year trend for sea otter population counts for the northern range was positive at 9.4 percent growth per year while the southern edge of the range had minimal growth at 0.55 percent per year. A colony of translocated sea otters near San Nicholas Island is showing population growth after ten years of low numbers. In 1991, only 16 individuals remained out of the original 139 from only a year prior, however, the current population is around 100 otters which follows the trend of other successful sea otter translocations. Both the California golden beaver and southern sea otter are considered keystone species, with a stabilizing and broad impact on their local ecosystems.

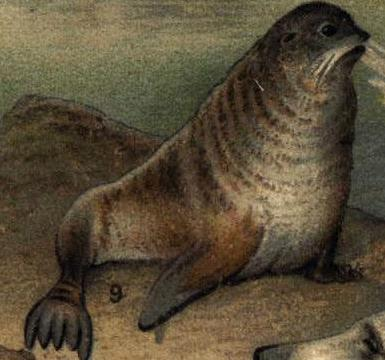
Drawing of a northern fur seal by Gustav Mützel

Northern fur seals (Callorhinus ursinus) were one of the first species to become protected through legislation with an international Fur Seal Treaty in 1911 which banned hunting fur seals in the ocean. The Marine Mammal Protection Act identifies the Northern Fur Seal population as depleted with the California population of fur seals estimated to be around 14,000. In 1966, the United States Congress passed the Fur Seal Act which banned the hunting of fur seals with the exception of substance hunting by Indigenous Americans. The seals began to recolonize the Farallon Islands in 1996.

In contrast, the Pacific Harbor seal (Phoca vitulina richardsi) is considered a species of least concern for endangerment of extinction. Their pelts were not nearly as popular as the otter or beaver. According to the Marine Mammal Center, the population of Pacific Harbor Seals off the coast of California is estimated to be around 34,000 individuals.

== See also ==
- Maritime fur trade
- List of watercourses in the San Francisco Bay Area
- Ecology of the San Francisco Estuary
- Martinez, California beavers
- North American beaver
- Beaver in the Sierra Nevada
- Sea otter
- Sea otter conservation
- California hide trade
