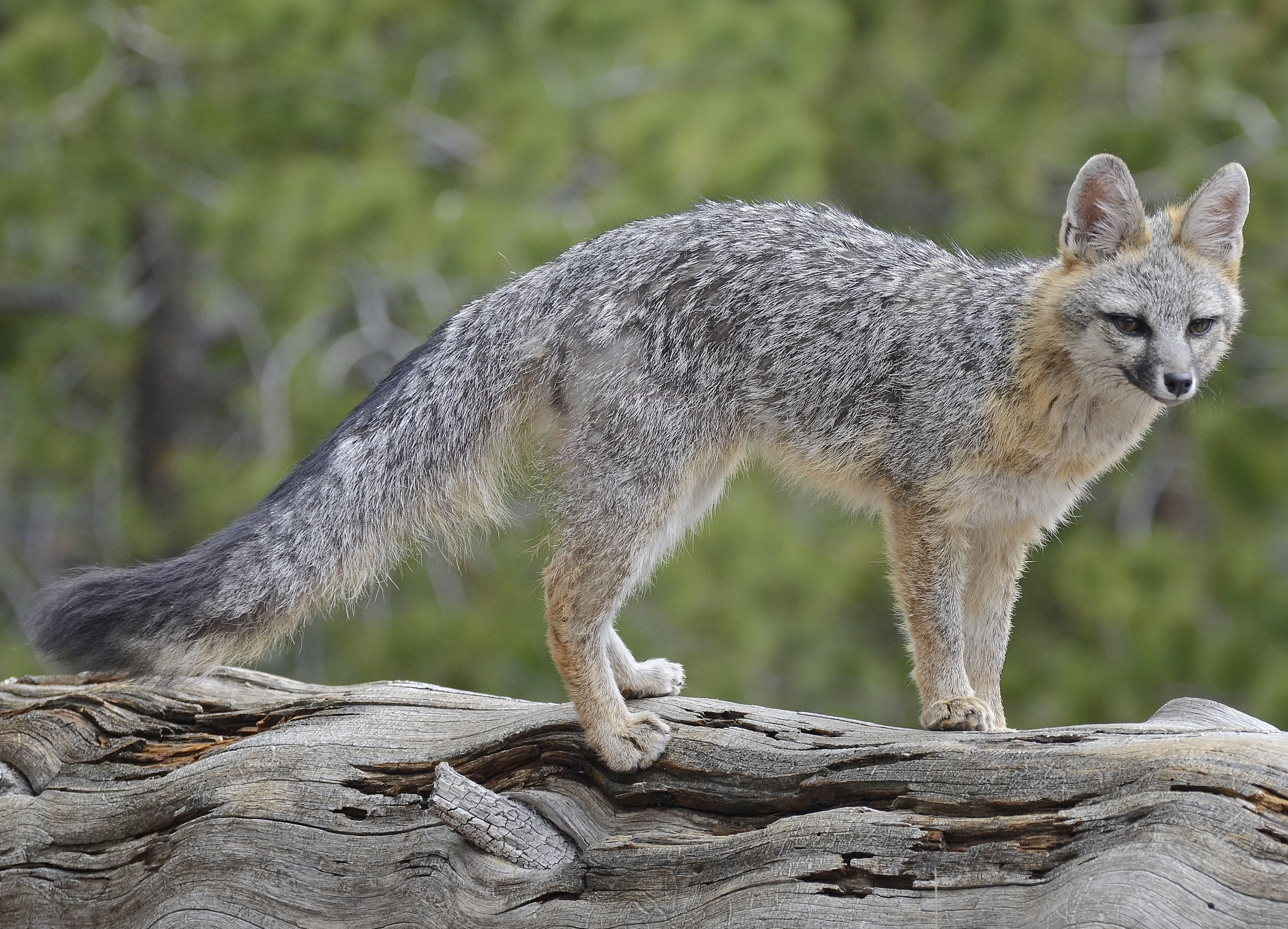
- In southern Nevada.

Conservation status
- Least Concern (IUCN 3.1)

Scientific classification
- Kingdom: Animalia
- Phylum: Chordata
- Class: Mammalia
- Order: Carnivora
- Family: Canidae
- Genus: Urocyon
- Species: U. cinereoargenteus

Binomial name
- Urocyon cinereoargenteus (Schreber, 1775)
- Gray fox range

= Gray fox =

Gray fox Temporal range: Early Pliocene–present 3.6 - 0 Ma

Species of canid

The gray fox (Urocyon cinereoargenteus), or grey fox, is an omnivorous mammal of the family Canidae, widespread throughout North America and Central America. This species and its only congener, the diminutive island fox (Urocyon littoralis) of the California Channel Islands, are the only living members of the genus Urocyon, which is considered to be genetically sister to all other living canids. Its species name cinereoargenteus means "ashen silver".

It was once the most common fox in the eastern United States, and though still found there, human advancement and deforestation allowed the red fox to become the predominant fox-like canid. Despite this post-colonial competition, the gray fox has been able to thrive in urban and suburban environments, one of the best examples being southern Florida. The Pacific States and Great Lakes region still have the gray fox as their prevalent fox.

== Etymology ==
The genus Urocyon comes from Ancient Greek οὐρά (ourá, "tail") + κύων (kúōn, "dog"). The species epithet cinereoargenteus is a combination of 'cinereo' (from 'cinereus') meaning ashen, and 'argenteus' (from argentum), meaning 'silver', referencing the color of the tail.

== Description ==
The gray fox is mainly distinguished from most other canids by its grizzled upper parts, black stripe down its tail and strong neck, ending in a black-tipped tail, while the skull can be easily distinguished from all other North American canids by its widely separated temporal ridges that form a 'U'-shape. Like other canids, the fox's ears and muzzle are angular and pointed. Its claws tend to be lengthier and curved.

There is little sexual dimorphism, save for the females being slightly smaller than males. The gray fox ranges from 76 to 112.5 cm (29.9 to 44.3 in) in total length. The tail measures 27.5 to 44.3 cm (10.8 to 17.4 in) of that length and its hind feet measure 100 to 150 mm (3.9 to 5.9 in). The gray fox typically weighs 3.6 to 7 kg (7.9 to 15.4 lb), though exceptionally large individuals can weigh as much as 9 kg (20 lb). The gray fox is readily distinguished from the red fox by its obvious lack of the "black stockings" that stand out on the red fox. The grey fox has a stripe of black hair that runs along the middle of its tail, and individual guard hairs that are banded with white, gray, and black. The gray fox displays white on the ears, throat, chest, belly, and hind legs. Gray foxes also have black around their eyes, on the lips, and on their noses.

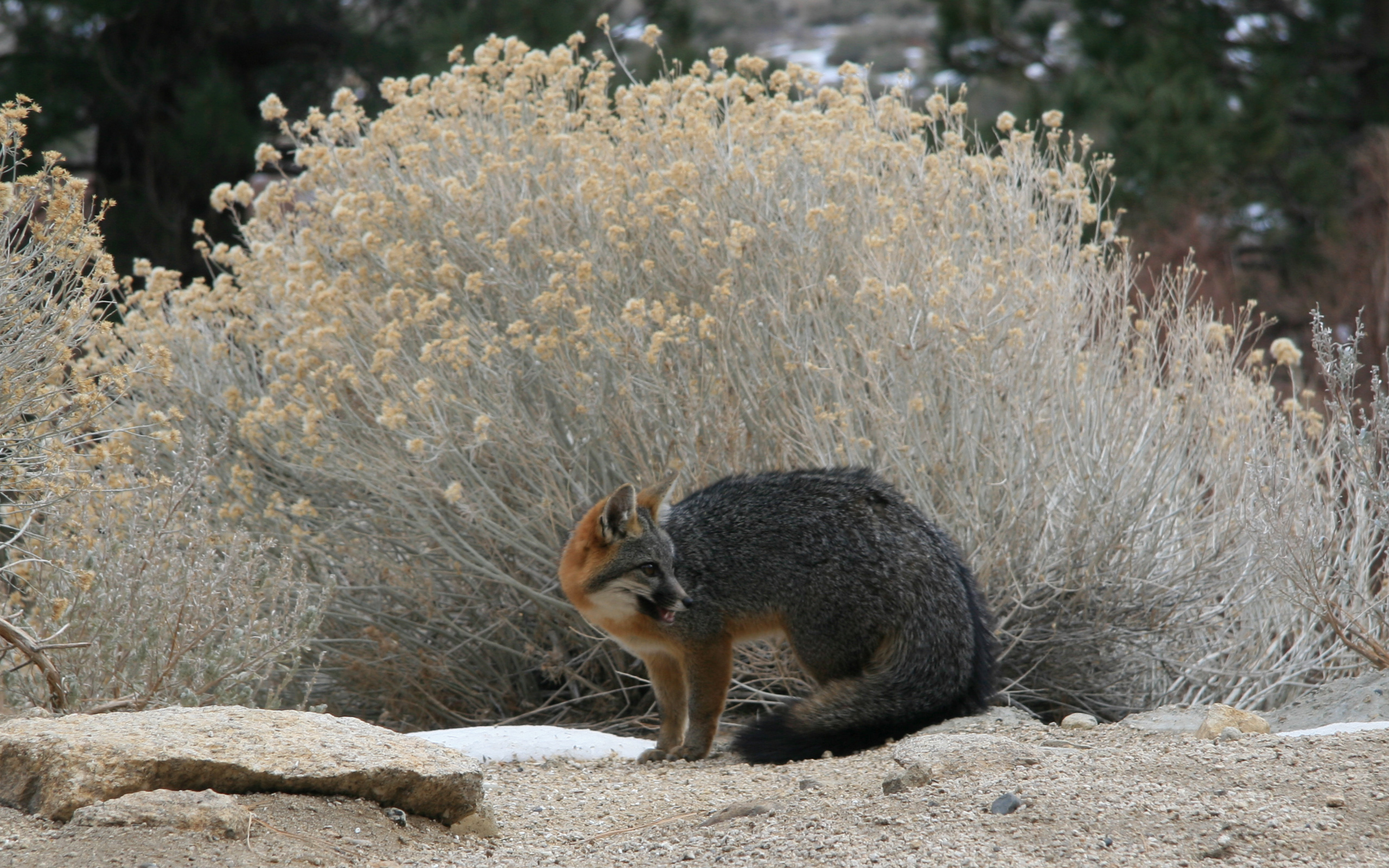
Showing black tail stripe, Sierra Nevada

In contrast to the species in genus Vulpes, such as the red fox, the gray fox has oval (instead of slit-like) pupils. The gray fox also has reddish coloration on parts of its body, including the legs, sides, feet, chest, and back and sides of the head and neck. The stripe on the fox's tail ends in a black tip as well. Its weight can be similar to that of a red fox, but the gray fox appears smaller because its fur is not as long and it has shorter limbs.

The dental formula of U. cinereoargenteus is 3.1.4.23.1.4.3 = 42.

== Origin and genetics ==
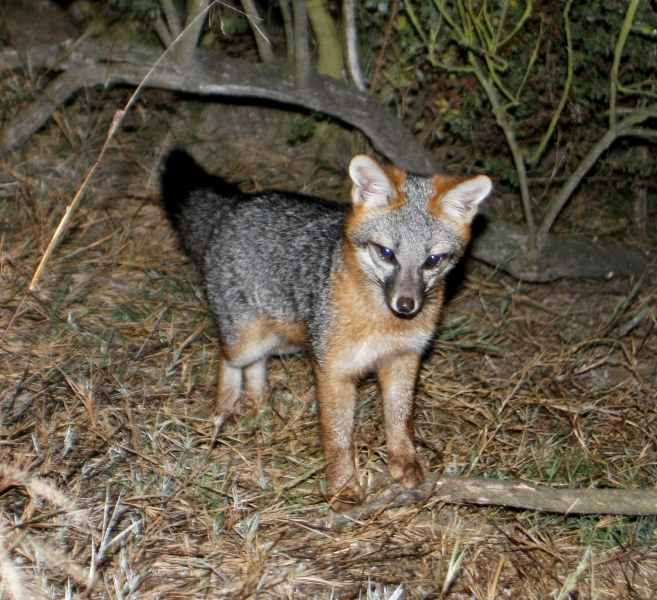
Kit at the Palo Alto Baylands in California

The gray fox appeared in North America during the mid-Pliocene (Hemphillian land animal age) epoch 3.6 million years ago (AEO) with the first fossil evidence found at the lower 111 Ranch site, Graham County, Arizona with contemporary mammals like the giant sloth, the elephant-like Cuvieronius, the large-headed llama, and the early small horses of Nannippus and Equus. Faunal remains at two northern California cave sites confirm the presence of the gray fox during the late Pleistocene. Genetic analysis has shown that the gray fox migrated into the northeastern United States post-Pleistocene in association with the Medieval Climate Anomaly warming trend.

Genetic analyses of the fox-like canids confirmed that the gray fox is a distinct genus from the red foxes (Vulpes spp.). The genus Urocyon is considered to be sister to the other living canid taxa. Genetically, the gray fox often clusters with two other ancient lineages: The east Asian raccoon dog (Nyctereutes procyonoides) and the African bat-eared fox (Otocyon megalotis).

The chromosome number is 66 (diploid) with a fundamental number of 70. The autosomes include 31 pairs of sub-graded subacrocentrics, but one only pair of metacentrics.

Recent mitochondrial genetic studies suggests divergence of North American eastern and western gray foxes in the Irvingtonian mid-Pleistocene into separate sister taxa. The gray fox's dwarf relative, the island fox, is likely descended from semi-domesticated mainland gray foxes. These foxes apparently were transported by humans to the islands and from island to island, and are descended from a minimum of 3–4 matrilineal founders.

== Distribution and habitat ==
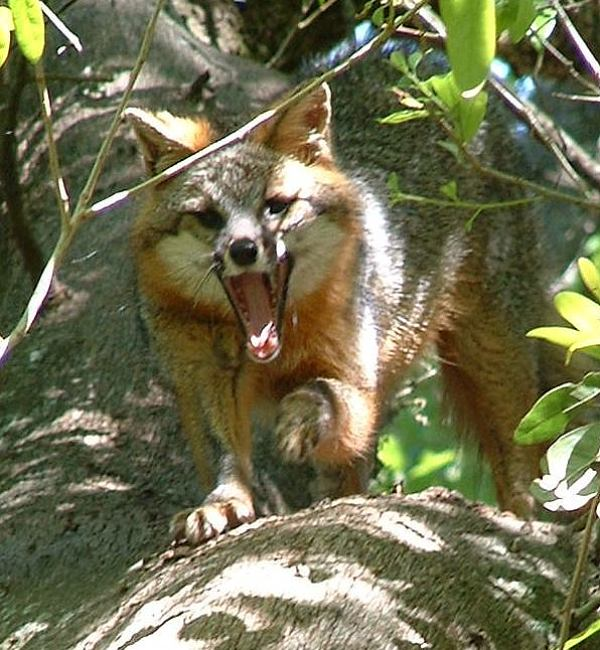
Yawning, northern Florida

The species occurs throughout most rocky, wooded, brushy regions of the southern half of North America from southern Canada (Manitoba through southeastern Quebec) to the northern part of South America (Venezuela and Colombia), excluding the mountains of northwestern United States. The species prefers a mix of wooded and agricultural land in the Midwest, juniper forests as well as ponderosa pine in the west, and deciduous forests in the east. It is the only canid whose natural range spans both North and South America. In some areas, high population densities exist near brush-covered bluffs. The species prefers a mix of forest and agricultural land towards the southern part of their range (Belize). In southeastern Mexico, the species prefers areas with a human presence such as near roads.

== Behavior ==
The gray fox is specifically adapted to climb trees. Its strong, hooked claws allow it to scramble up trees to escape many predators, such as the domestic dog or the coyote, or to reach tree-bound or arboreal food sources. It can climb branchless, vertical trunks to heights of 18 metres (59 ft) and jump from branch to branch. It descends primarily by jumping from branch to branch, or by descending slowly backwards like a domestic cat. The gray fox is primarily nocturnal or crepuscular and makes its den in hollow trees, stumps or appropriated burrows during the day. Such gray fox tree dens may be located 30 ft (9 m) above the ground. For the most part, they rest on the ground rather than higher up in trees.

Prior to European colonization of North America, the red fox was found primarily in boreal forest and the gray fox in deciduous forest. With the increase in human populations in North America, their habitat selection has adapted: Gray foxes that live near human populations tend to choose areas near hardwood trees, locations used primarily by humans, or roads to utilize as their habitat.

The increase of coyote populations around North America has reduced certain fox populations, so gray foxes choose habitats that will allow escape from coyotes, therefore the foxes's tendency to live nearer to areas where humans are active. The larger predators of the gray fox, like coyotes and bobcats, tend to avoid human-use areas and paved roads. They heavily utilize the edges of forests as a travel corridor, which is used for primary movement from place to place. Their choices do not change based on sex, the season, or the time of day. They also do the majority of their hunting in edges, and use them to escape from predators as well. Gray foxes are thus known as an "edge species."

== Interspecies competition ==
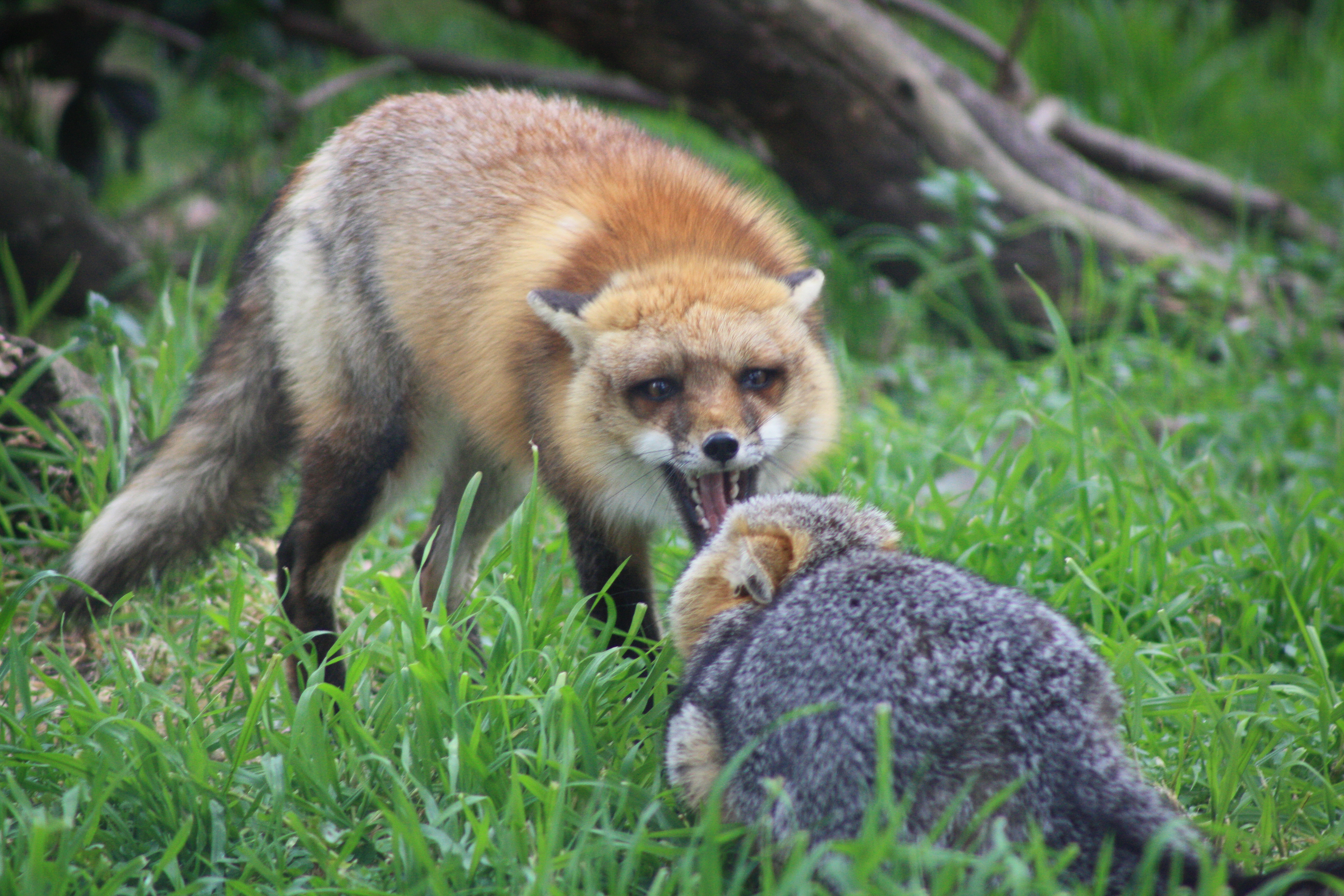
A red fox (Vulpes vulpes) confronting a gray fox, San Joaquin Wildlife Refuge

Gray foxes often hunt for the same prey as bobcats and coyotes who occupy the same region. To avoid interspecific competition, the gray fox has developed certain behaviors and habits to increase their survival chances. In regions where gray foxes and coyotes hunt for the same food, the gray fox has been observed to give space to the coyote, staying within its own established range for hunting. Gray foxes may also avoid competitors by occupying different habitats from them. In California, gray foxes do this by living in chaparral where their competitors are fewer and the low shrubbery provides them a greater chance to escape from a dangerous encounter. It also has been suggested that gray foxes could be more active at night than during the day to avoid larger, diurnal competitors.

Still, gray foxes frequently fall victim to bobcats and coyotes. When killed, the carcasses are often unconsumed, suggesting they are victims of intraguild predation. These gray foxes are often killed on or near the boundary of their established range, when they begin to interfere with their competitors. Gray foxes are known as mesopredators because they are mid-tier predators and their prey consists mostly of smaller mammals, while coyotes are known as de facto apex predators due to the removal of other apex predators, like wolves, in North America. This explains the gray fox's tendency to change behavior in response to the coyote threat, as they are essentially lower on the food chain.

== Reproduction ==
The gray fox is assumed to be monogamous, like other foxes. The breeding season of the gray fox varies geographically; in Michigan, the gray fox mates in early March, in Alabama, breeding peaks occur in February. The gestation period lasts approximately 53 days. Litter size ranges from 1–7, with a mean of 3.8 young per female.

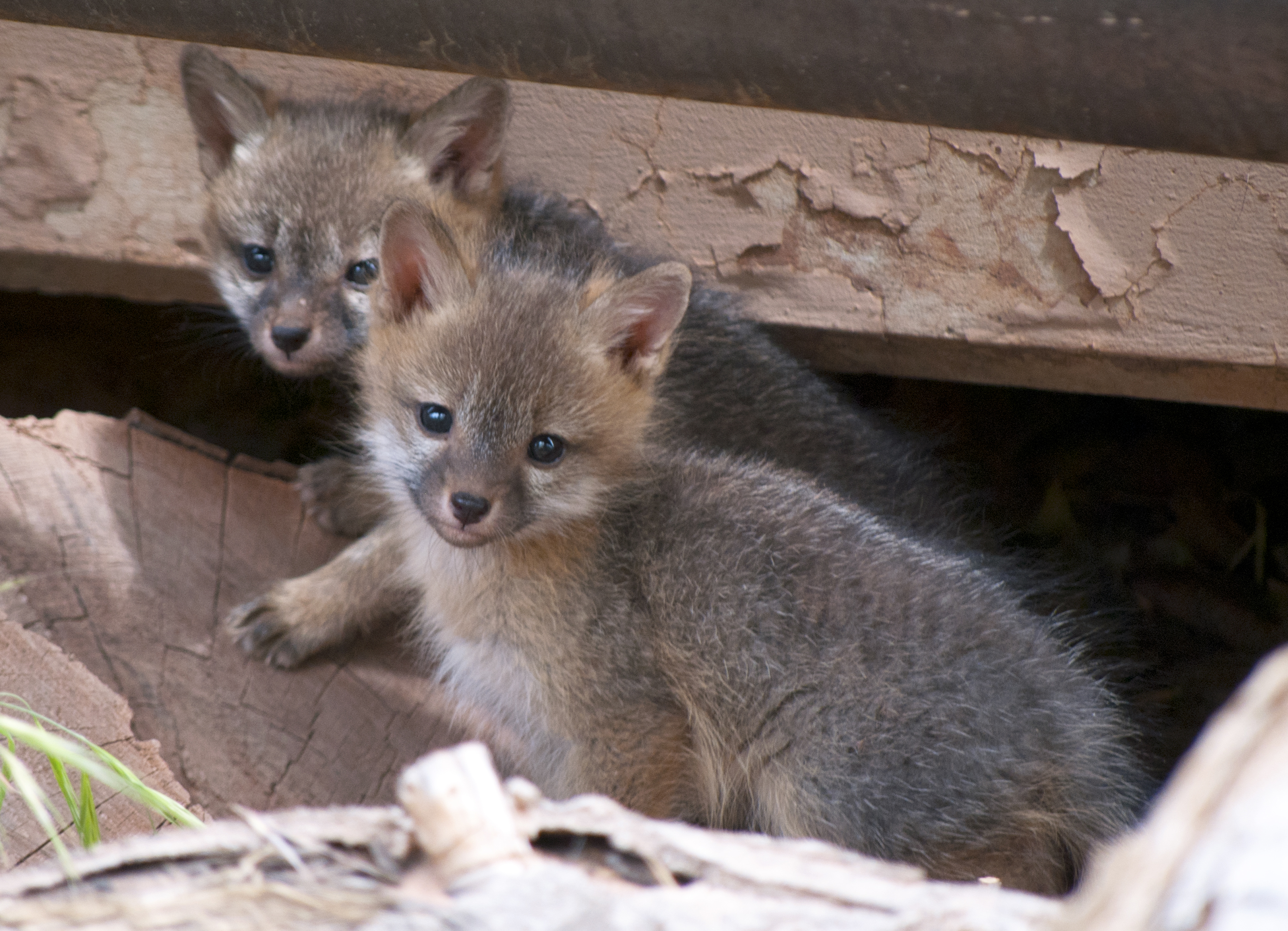
Kits at Zion Canyon

The sexual maturity of females is around 10 months of age. Kits begin to hunt with their parents at the age of 3 months. By the time that they are 4 months old, the kits will have developed their permanent dentition and can now easily forage on their own. The family group remains together until the autumn, when the young males reach sexual maturity, then they disperse. In a study of 9 juvenile gray foxes, only the males dispersed, moving up to 84 km (52 mi). The juvenile females stayed within proximity of the den within 3 km (1.9 mi) and always returned. Adult gray foxes showed no signs of dispersion for either sex. The gray fox will typically live between six and ten years.

The annual reproductive cycle of males has been described through epididymal smears. They become fertile earlier and remain fertile longer than females.

Logs, trees, rocks, burrows, or abandoned dwellings serve as suitable den sites. Dens are used at any time during the year but mostly during whelping season. Dens are built in brushy or wooded regions and are better concealed than the dens of the red fox.

== Diet ==
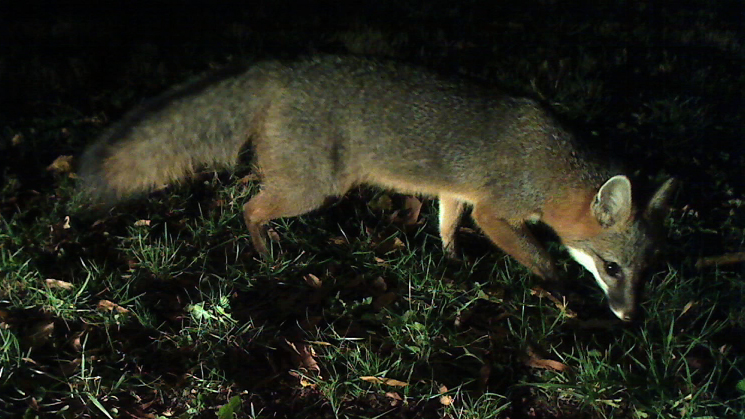
At night

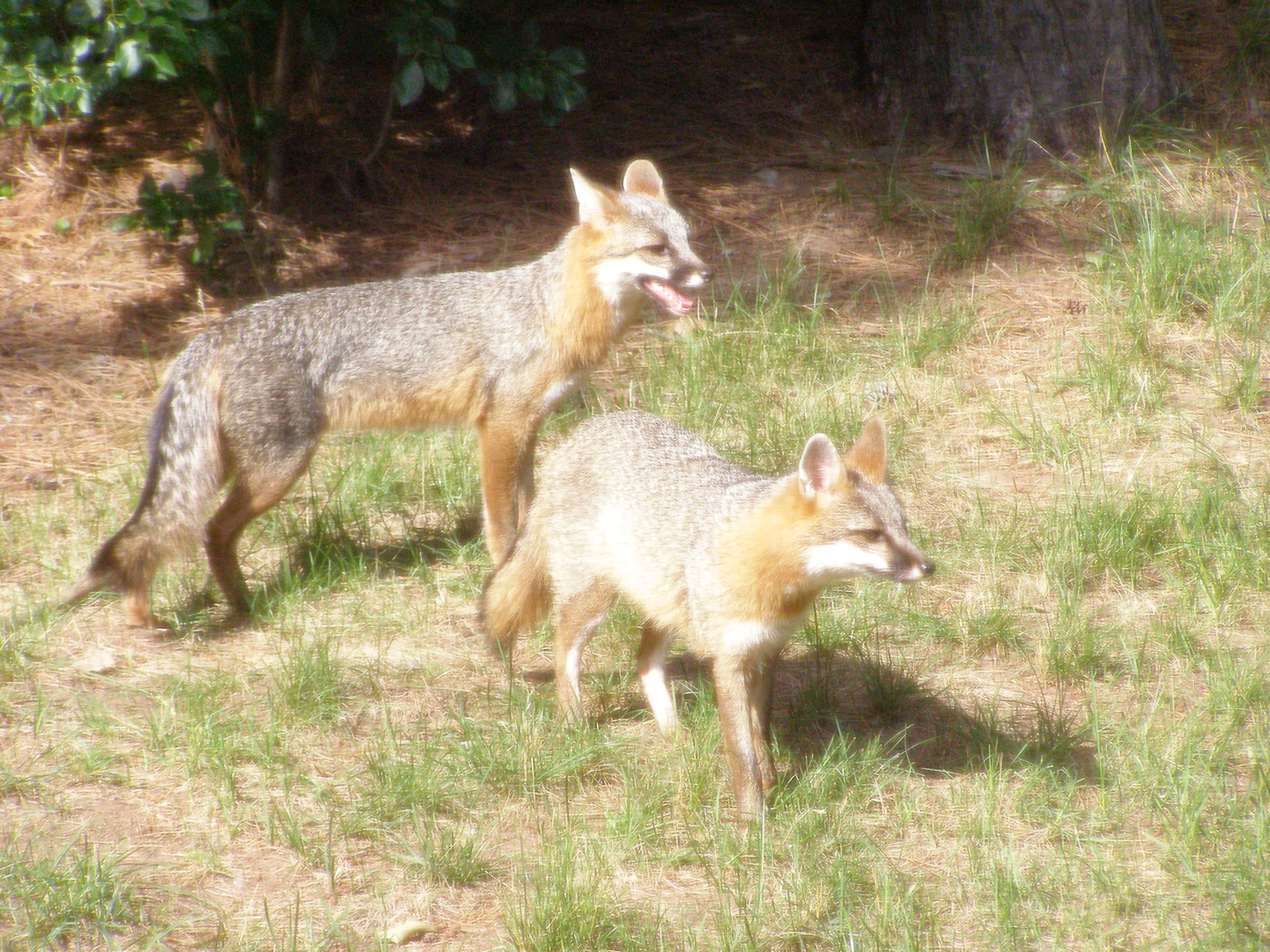
Adult male and female

The gray fox is an omnivorous, solitary hunter. It frequently preys on the eastern cottontail (Sylvilagus floridanus) in the eastern U.S., though it will readily catch voles, shrews, and birds. In California, the gray fox primarily eats rodents (such as deer mice, woodrats, and cotton rats), followed by lagomorphs, e.g. jackrabbit, brush rabbit, etc. When it is available, gray foxes may also feed on carrion. In some parts of the Western United States (such as in the Zion National Park in Utah), the gray fox is primarily insectivorous and herbivorous. Fruit is an important component of the diet of the gray fox, and they seek whatever fruits are readily available, generally eating more vegetable matter than does the red fox (Vulpes vulpes). Generally, there is an increase in fruits and invertebrates (such as grasshoppers, beetles, butterflies, and moths) within the gray fox's diet in the transition from winter to spring. As nuts, grains, and fruits become more numerous, they are cached by foxes. Typically, they attempt to cover the area with their scent either through their scent glands or urine. This marking serves the dual purpose of allowing them to find the food again later and preventing other animals from taking it.

== Ecosystem role ==
Since woodrats, cotton rats, and mice make up a large part of the gray fox's diet, they serve as important regulators of small rodent populations.

In addition to their beneficial predation on rodents, gray foxes are also less welcome hosts to some external and internal parasites, which include fleas, lice, nematodes, and tapeworms. In the United States, the most common parasite of the gray fox is a flea (Pulex simulans); however, several previously undocumented parasitic arthropods were found in populations in central Mexico, and a warming climate may encourage them to migrate north.

== Hunting ==
Gray foxes are hunted in the U.S. The intensity of the hunting has correlated with the value of their pelts. Between the 1970–1971 and 1975–1976 hunting seasons, the price of gray fox pelts greatly increased and the number of individuals hunted jumped over six-fold from 26,109 to 163,458. It has been recently reported that over 500,000 gray foxes are killed every year for their fur.

== Subspecies ==
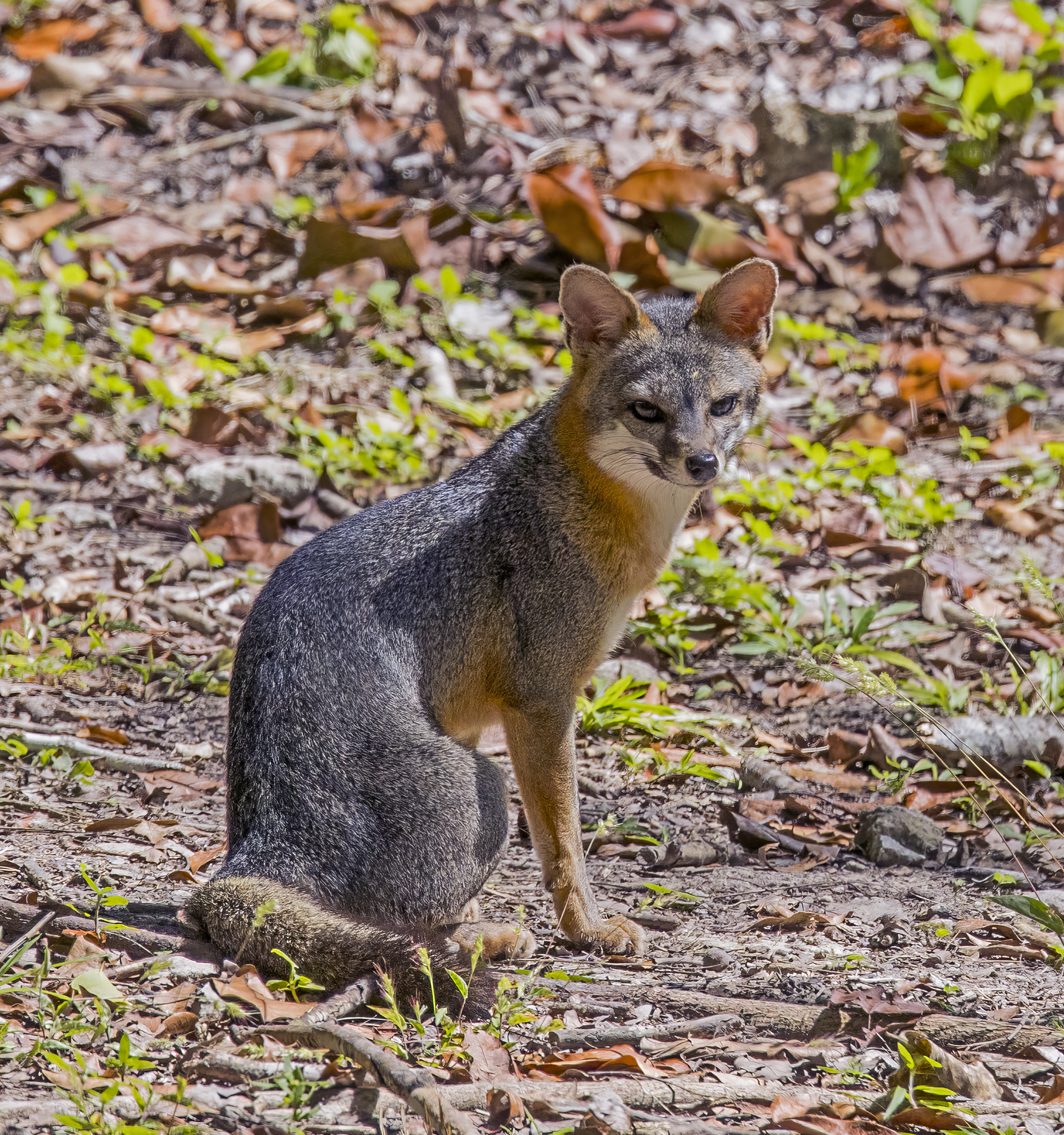
U. c. fraterculus Tikal, Guatemala

There are 16 subspecies recognized for the gray fox.

- Urocyon cinereoargenteus borealis (New England)
- Urocyon cinereoargenteus californicus (southern California)
- Urocyon cinereoargenteus cinereoargenteus (eastern United States)
- Urocyon cinereoargenteus costaricensis (Costa Rica)
- Urocyon cinereoargenteus floridanus (Gulf states)
- Urocyon cinereoargenteus fraterculus (Yucatán)
- Urocyon cinereoargenteus furvus (Panama)
- Urocyon cinereoargenteus guatemalae (southernmost Mexico south to Nicaragua)
- Urocyon cinereoargenteus madrensis (southern Sonora, south-west Chihuahua, and north-west Durango)
- Urocyon cinereoargenteus nigrirostris (south-west Mexico)
- Urocyon cinereoargenteus ocythous (Central Plains states)
- Urocyon cinereoargenteus orinomus (southern Mexico, Isthmus of Tehuantepec)
- Urocyon cinereoargenteus peninsularis (Baja California)
- Urocyon cinereoargenteus scottii (south-western United States and northern Mexico)
- Urocyon cinereoargenteus townsendi (northern California and Oregon)
- Urocyon cinereoargenteus venezuelae (Colombia and Venezuela)

== Parasites ==
Parasites of gray fox include trematode Metorchis conjunctus. Other common parasites that were collected on gray foxes in Texas were a variety of tapeworms (Mesocestoides litteratus, Taenia pisiformis, Taenia serialis) and roundworms (Ancylostoma caninum, Ancylostoma braziliense, Haemonchus similis, Spirocerca lupi, Physaloptera rara, Eucoleus aerophilus). T. pisiformis was the most common parasite species and was associated with frequent impacts on health.

== See also ==
- Cozumel fox, a recently/nearly extinct grey fox formerly found on Mexico's Cozumel Island
- South American gray fox, also known as the gray zorro, but only distantly related
- Urocyon progressus, the extinct ancestor of the gray fox
