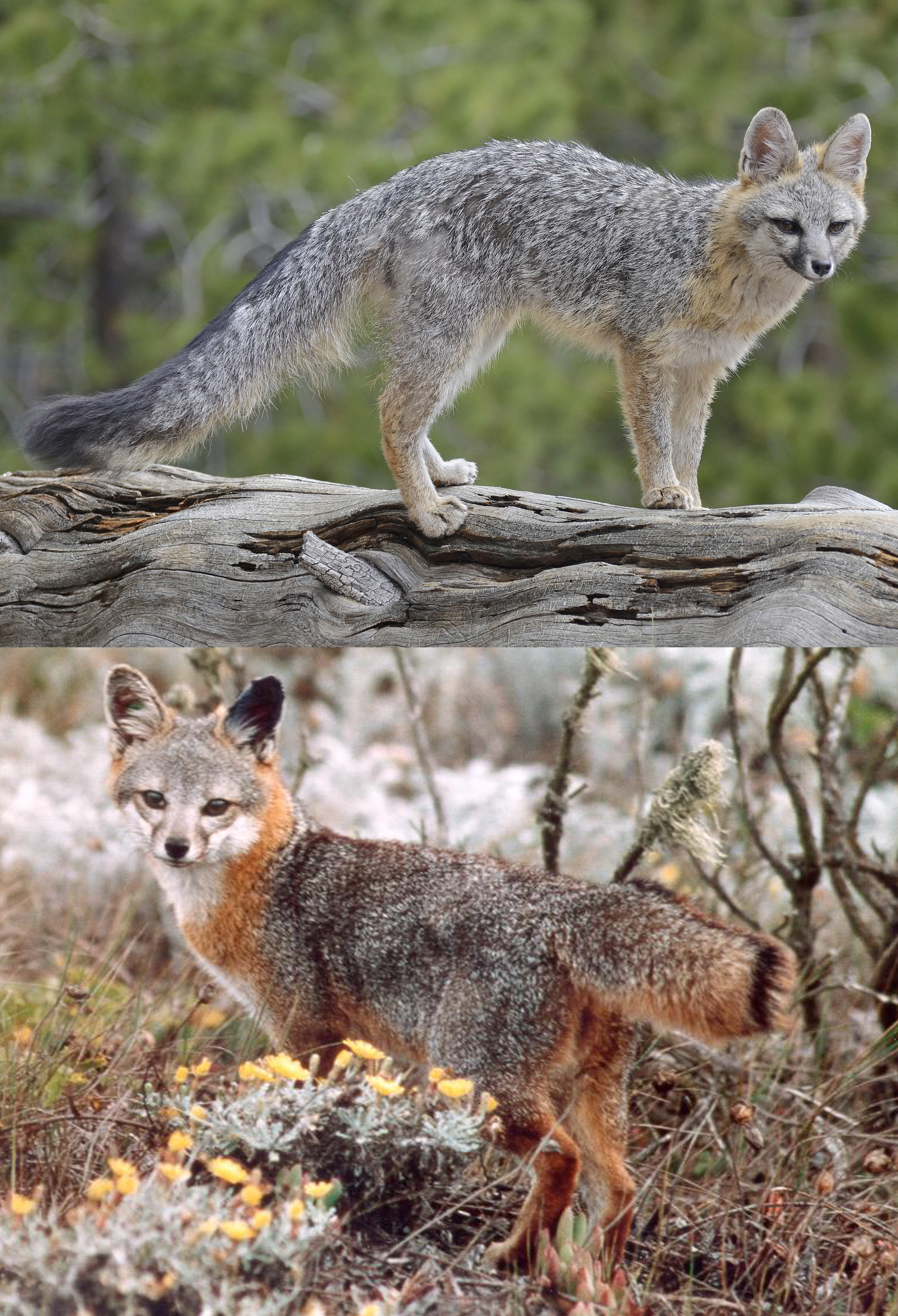
- Gray and island fox

Scientific classification
- Kingdom: Animalia
- Phylum: Chordata
- Class: Mammalia
- Order: Carnivora
- Family: Canidae
- Subfamily: Caninae
- Tribe: Urocyonini
- Genus: Urocyon; Baird, 1857

Type species
- Canis virginianus Schreber, 1774

Species
- U. cinereoargenteus (Schreber), 1774; U. littoralis Baird, 1857; † U. citrinus Tedford, Wang & Taylor (2009); † U. galushai Tedford, Wang & Taylor (2009); † U. minicephalus Martin, 1974; † U. progressus Stevens, 1965; † U. webbi Tedford, Wang & Taylor (2009)

= Urocyon =

Urocyon Temporal range: 10.3–0 Ma

Genus of carnivores

Urocyon (Greek: "tailed dog") is a genus of Canidae which includes the gray fox (Urocyon cinereoargenteus) and the island fox (Urocyon littoralis). These two fox species are found in the Western Hemisphere. Whole genome sequencing indicates that, among living canids, Urocyon is sister to the remaining genera. Fossils of what is believed to be the ancestor of the gray fox, Urocyon progressus, have been found in Kansas and date to the Upper Pliocene, with some undescribed specimens dating even older.

== Extant species ==
Genus Urocyon – Baird, 1857 – two species
Common name	Scientific name and subspecies	Range	IUCN status and estimated population
Gray fox	Urocyon cinereoargenteus (Schreber, 1775)	Southern half of North America from southern Canada to the northern part of South America (Venezuela and Colombia), excluding the mountains of northwestern United States	LC
Island fox	Urocyon littoralis (Baird, 1857) Six subspecies: U. l. littoralis (the nominate subspecies) of San Miguel Island, U. l. dickeyi of San Nicolas Island, U. l. catalinae of Santa Catalina Island, U. l. clementae of San Clemente Island, U. l. santacruzae of Santa Cruz Island, and; U. l. santarosae of Santa Rosa Island.	Channel Islands (off the coast of Southern California)	NT

== Extinct species ==
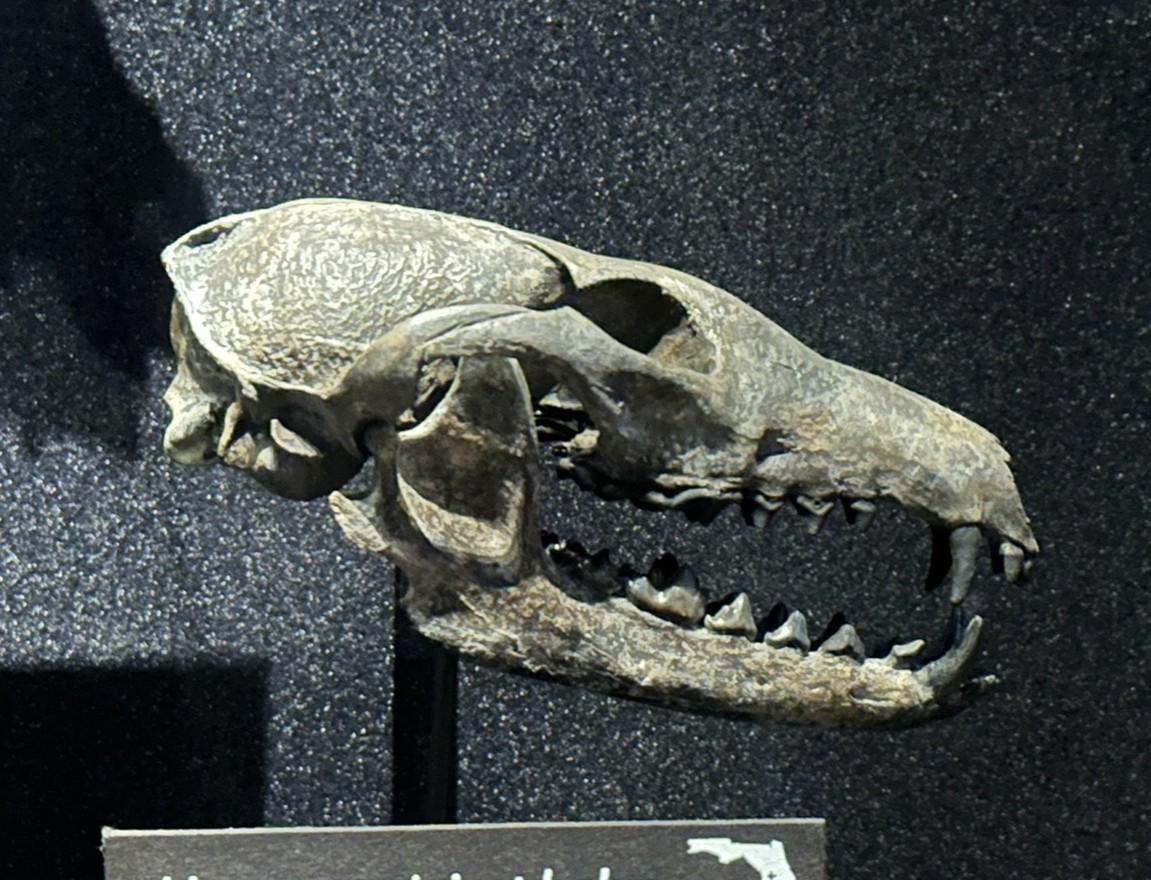
Skull cast of U. minicephalus, Florida Museum of Natural History

Species name	Type specimen era and location
U. citrinus	Tedford et al., 2009. Early Irvingtonian, Citrus County, Florida.
U. galushai	Tedford et al., 2009. Late Blancan, San Simon Valley, Graham County, Arizona.
U. minicephalus	Martin, 1974. Late Irvingtonian, Sumter County, Florida.
U. progressus	Stevens, 1965. Early Blancan, Meade County, Kansas. A later review found that the material represents Urocyon, but because of its fragmentary nature cannot be diagnosed as to species.
U. webbi	Tedford et al., 2009. Middle Hemphillian, Citrus County, Florida.

== Cozumel fox ==
The Cozumel fox is a critically endangered small gray fox found on the island of Cozumel, Mexico. The last reported sighting was in 2001, but surveys focusing on this species have not yet been carried out. In September 2023, a live Cozumel fox was rescued from a road and subsequently released.The photos taken of this fox were released to the public on June 8th of 2026, being the first photos ever taken of the species.

The Cozumel fox has not been scientifically described, but is a dwarf form, like the island fox. Compared to the island fox, however, it is slightly larger, being up to three-quarters the size of the gray fox. No skins or complete skulls of the Cozumel fox exist in any museum exhibitions, so scientists have mainly examined sub-fossils collected during archaeological excavations of Mayan civilizations who inhabited the island about 1,500–500 years ago. Upon evaluating bones from about 12 adult individuals, scientists have concluded that the Cozumel fox is extremely small – approximately 60-80% the body size of other mainland specimens.

The fox had been isolated on Cozumel for at least 5,000 years, and probably far longer. These dates would indicate that Urocyon had colonized the island before the first arrival of humans there.
