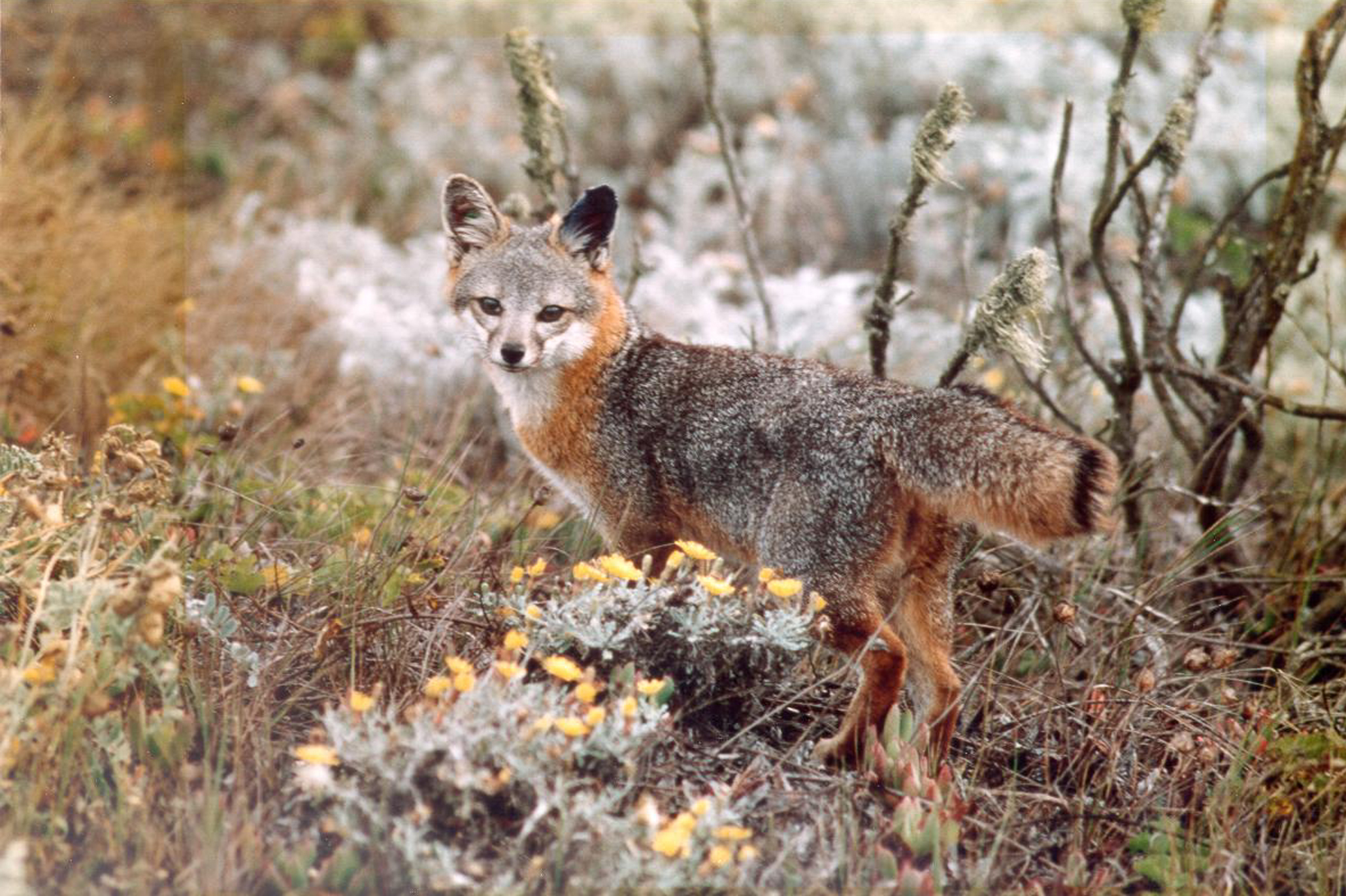

Conservation status
- Near Threatened (IUCN 3.1)

- Vulnerable (NatureServe)

Scientific classification
- Kingdom: Animalia
- Phylum: Chordata
- Class: Mammalia
- Order: Carnivora
- Family: Canidae
- Genus: Urocyon
- Species: U. littoralis

Binomial name
- Urocyon littoralis (Baird, 1857)
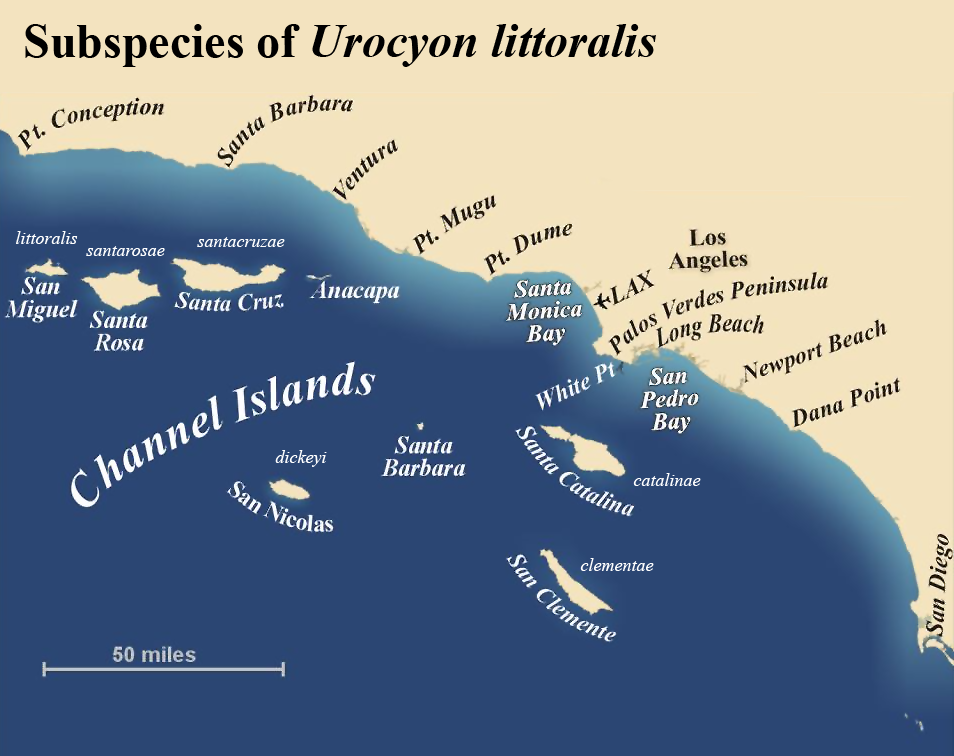
- Respective islands for each subspecies

= Island fox =

Island fox Temporal range: Holocene 7,300 years ago-Present

Species of fox

The island fox (Urocyon littoralis) is a small fox species that is endemic to six of the eight Channel Islands of California. They evolved from their larger mainland gray fox ancestor (U. cinereoargenteus) and have diversified into six subspecies, each confined to its own island and all exhibiting insular dwarfism. Island foxes are generally docile, show little fear of humans, and are easily tamed. Island foxes have played an important role in the spiritual lives of native Channel Islanders. They were likely semi-domesticated as pets, for their pelts, or other functions, like pest control. Genetic and archaeological evidence suggests that the foxes arrived on the islands around 7,000 years ago, probably with the assistance of early human populations.

== Taxonomy and evolution ==
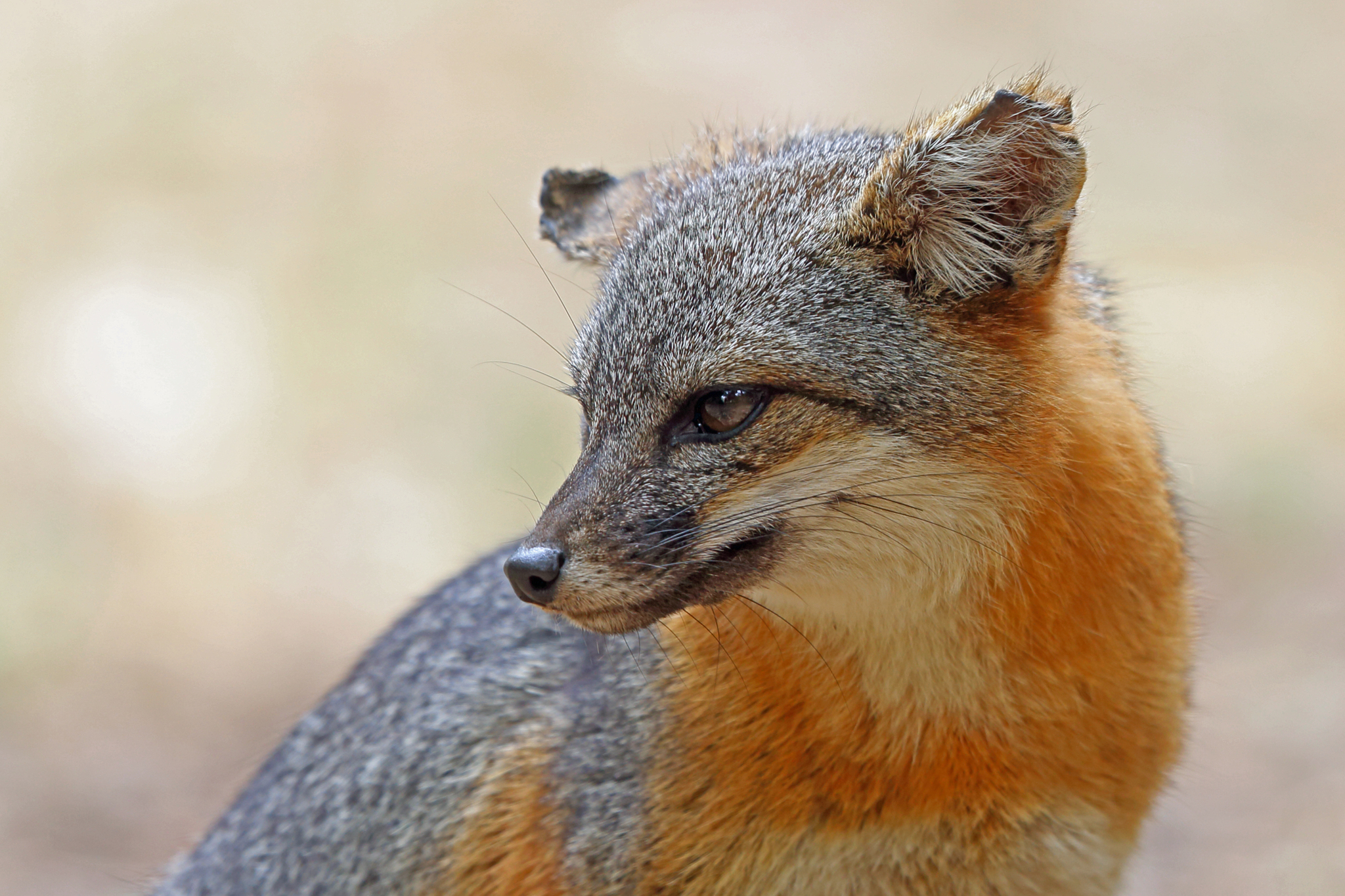
Portrait of a Santa Cruz island fox (Urocyon littoralis santacruzae)

Genetic and archaeological evidence indicates that the species descends from a population of the mainland gray fox that arrived on the islands around 7,300 years ago, possibly due to having been introduced to the islands by humans. Humans are almost certainly responsible for their presence on the southern islands. The species is around 25% smaller than its mainland ancestor, an example of insular dwarfism.

Because the island fox is geographically isolated, it has not acquired immunity to parasites and diseases brought in from the mainland and is especially vulnerable to those that the domestic dog (Canis familiaris) may carry. In addition, predation by the golden eagle (Aquila chrysaetos) and human activities devastated fox numbers on several of the Channel Islands in the 1990s. Four island fox subspecies were federally protected as an endangered species in 2004, and efforts to rebuild fox populations and restore the ecosystems of the Channel Islands are being undertaken. Radio collars are being attached to foxes in an effort to track and locate the young foxes. To date these efforts have been largely successful.

There are six subspecies of the island fox, each of which is native to a specific Channel Island, and which evolved there independently of the others. The subspecies are:

- U. l. littoralis (the nominate subspecies) of San Miguel Island,
- U. l. dickeyi of San Nicolas Island,
- U. l. catalinae of Santa Catalina Island,
- U. l. clementae of San Clemente Island,
- U. l. santacruzae of Santa Cruz Island, and
- U. l. santarosae of Santa Rosa Island.

Foxes from each island are capable of interbreeding, but have genetic and phenotypic distinctions that make them unique; for example, some subspecies have differing numbers of tail vertebrae. The fox did not persist on the two smallest islands. On Anacapa Island because it has no reliable source of fresh water; and on Santa Barbara Island which is too small to support the food needs of a viable fox population.

Other names for the island fox include coast fox, short-tailed fox, island gray fox, Channel Islands fox, Channel Islands gray fox, California Channel Islands fox and insular gray fox.

== Description ==
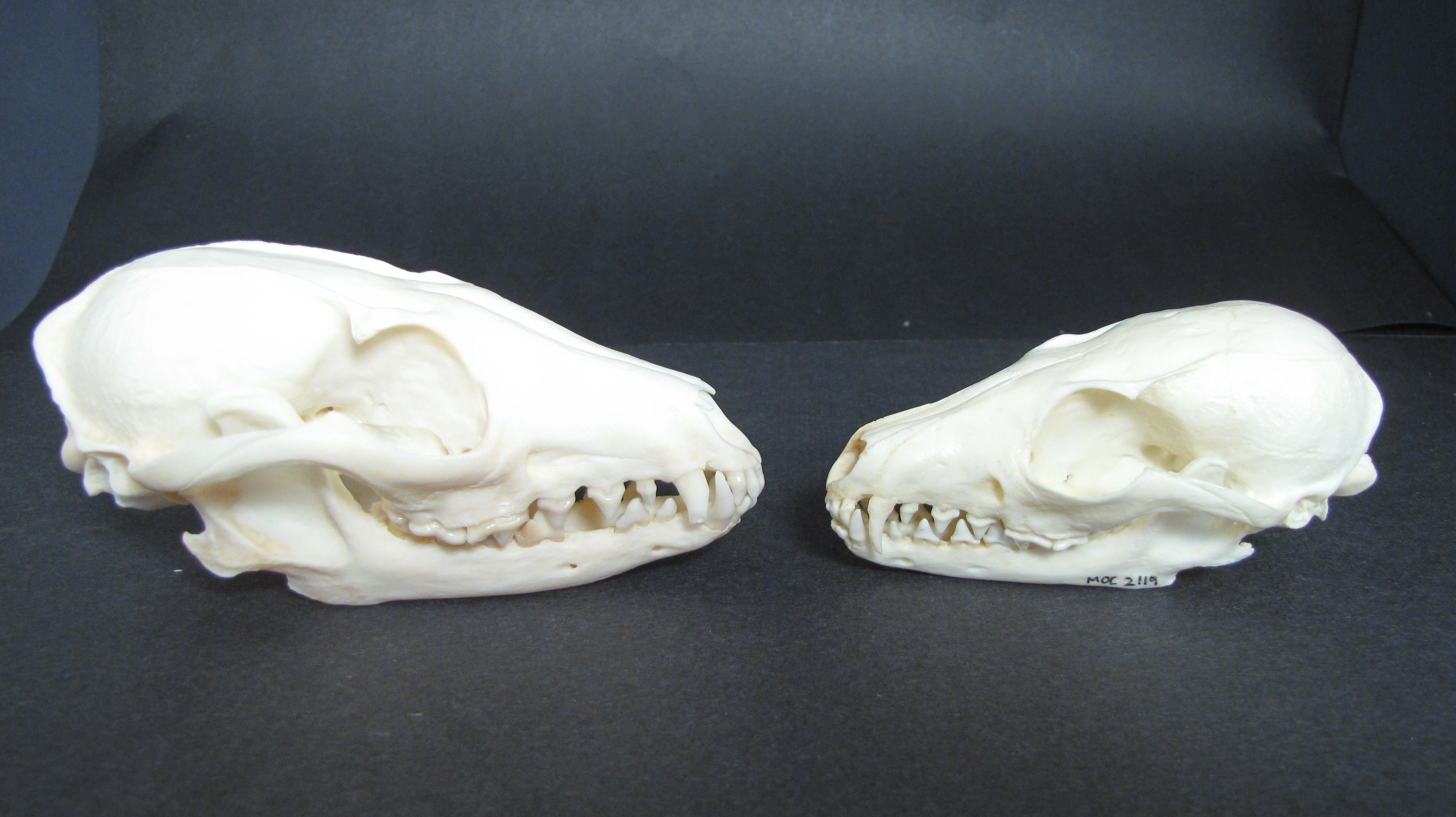
The skull of a mainland gray fox (left) compared with the skull of an island fox (right)

The island fox is the smallest fox in North America with head-and-body length is 48–50 cm (19–19.5 in), shoulder height 12–15 cm (4.5–6 in), and the tail is 11–29 cm (4.5–11.5 in) long. This is notably shorter than the 27–44 cm (10.5–17.5 in) tail of the gray fox, slightly smaller than the swift (Vulpes velox) and kit foxes (Vulpes macrotis), and as long but of shorter height than domesticated cats (Felis Catus). Its shorter length is due to the fact that the island fox generally has two fewer tail vertebrae than the gray fox. The island fox weighs between 1 and 2.8 kg (2.2 and 6.2 lb). The species exhibits sexual dimorphism: the male is always larger than the female. The largest of the subspecies occurs on Santa Catalina Island and the smallest on Santa Cruz Island.

The island fox has gray fur on its head, a ruddy red coloring on its sides, white fur on its belly, throat and the lower half of its face, and a black stripe on the dorsal surface of its tail. In general the coat is darker and duller hued than that of the gray fox. The island fox molts once a year between August and November. Before the first molt pups are woolly and have a generally darker coat than adult foxes. A brown phase, with the grey and black fur of the body replaced by a sandy brown and a deeper brown, may occur in the San Clemente Island and San Nicolas Island populations. It is unclear if this is a true color phase, a change that occurs with age, or possibly a change that occurs because of interactions with Opuntia cactus spines that become embedded in the pelt.

== Reproduction ==
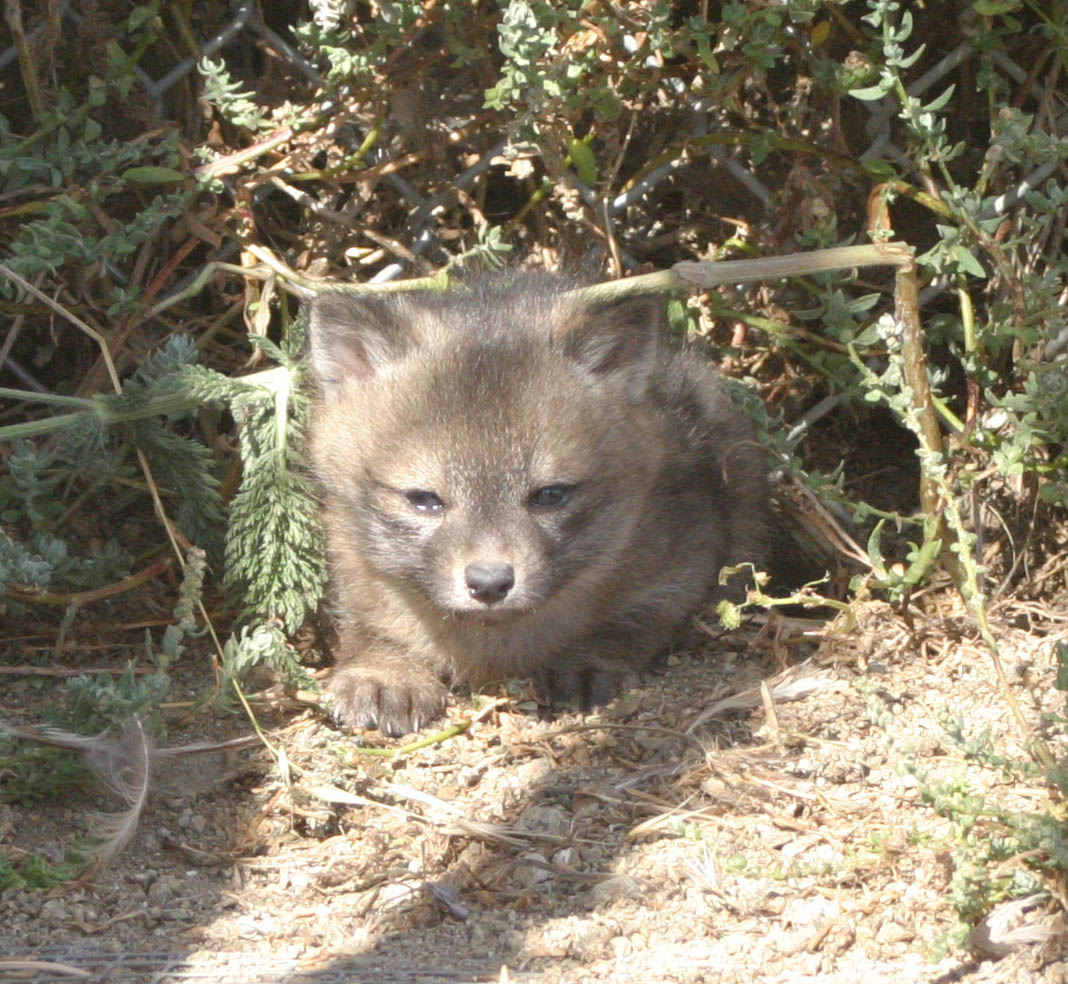
An island fox kit nestled in the brush

The island fox typically forms monogamous breeding pairs, which are frequently seen together beginning in January and through the breeding season, from late February to early March. The gestation period is 50–63 days. The female island fox gives birth in a den, a typical litter having one to five pups, with an average of two or three. Pups are born in the spring and emerge from the den in early summer; the mother lactates for 7–9 weeks. Sexual maturity is reached at 10 months, and the females usually breed within the first year. Island foxes live for 4–6 years in the wild and for up to 8 years in captivity.

=== Genomic analysis ===
Island foxes have existed in small populations with low diversity for many generations. Morphological analysis indicate an absence of inbreeding depression. Apparently, the explanation for the absence of inbreeding depression is that, over the long-term, the small population size of island foxes facilitated a reduced burden of strongly deleterious recessive mutations through genetic purging by natural selection. Purging of deleterious recessive mutations occurs when their detrimental effect is expressed in homozygous individuals.

== Ecology and behavior ==
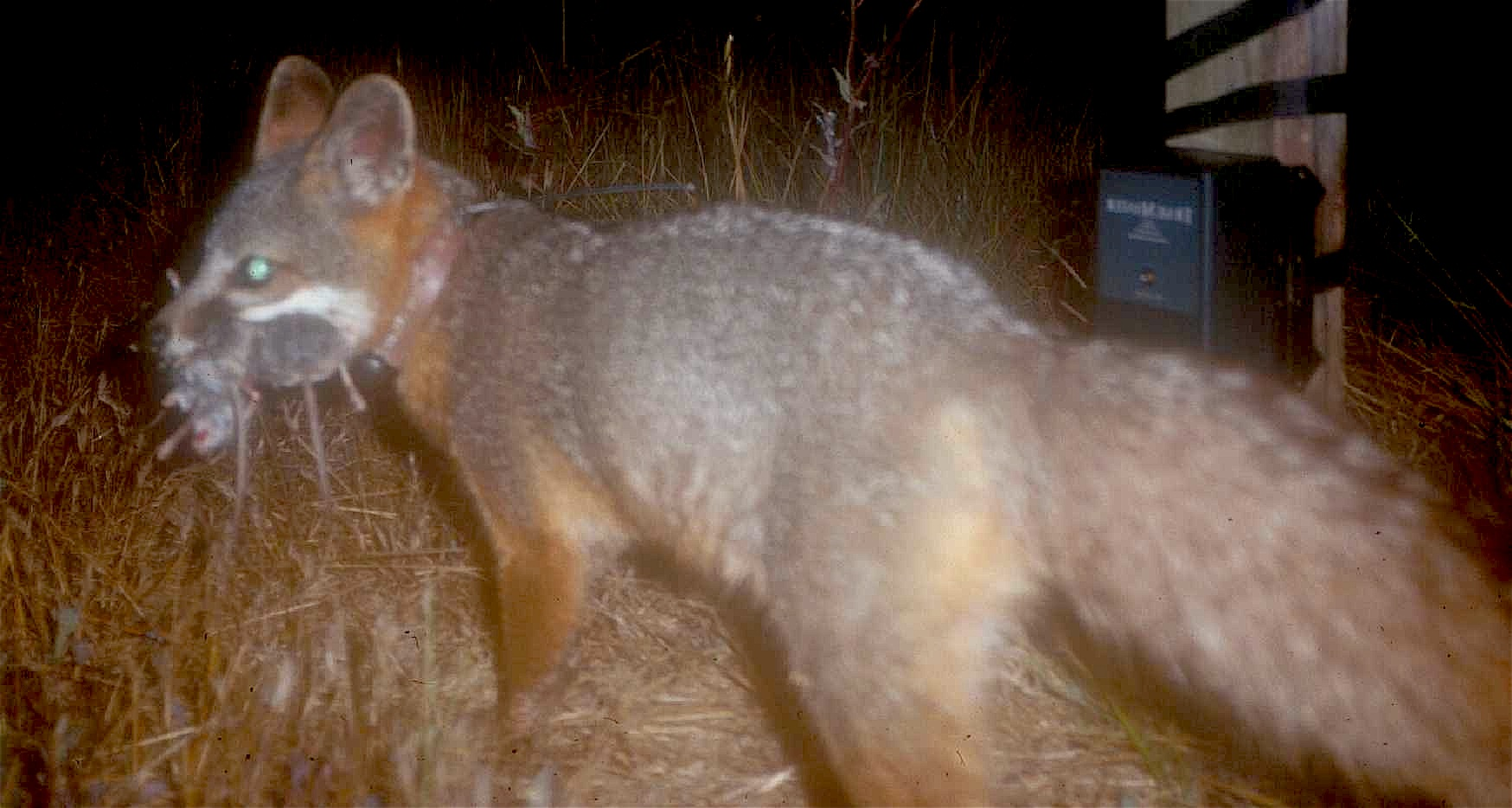
An island fox at night with three mice in its jaws

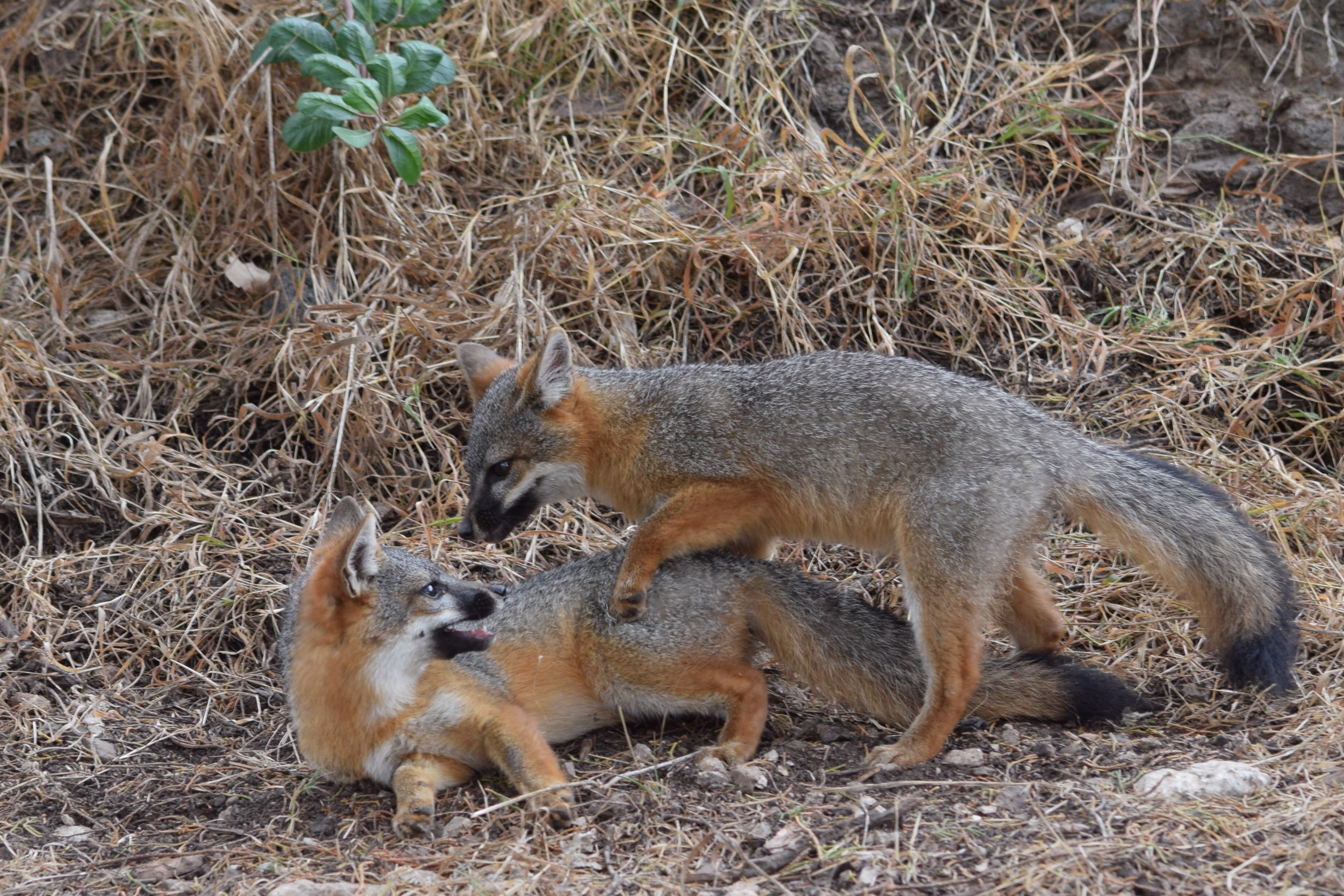
A mother fox playing with its cub

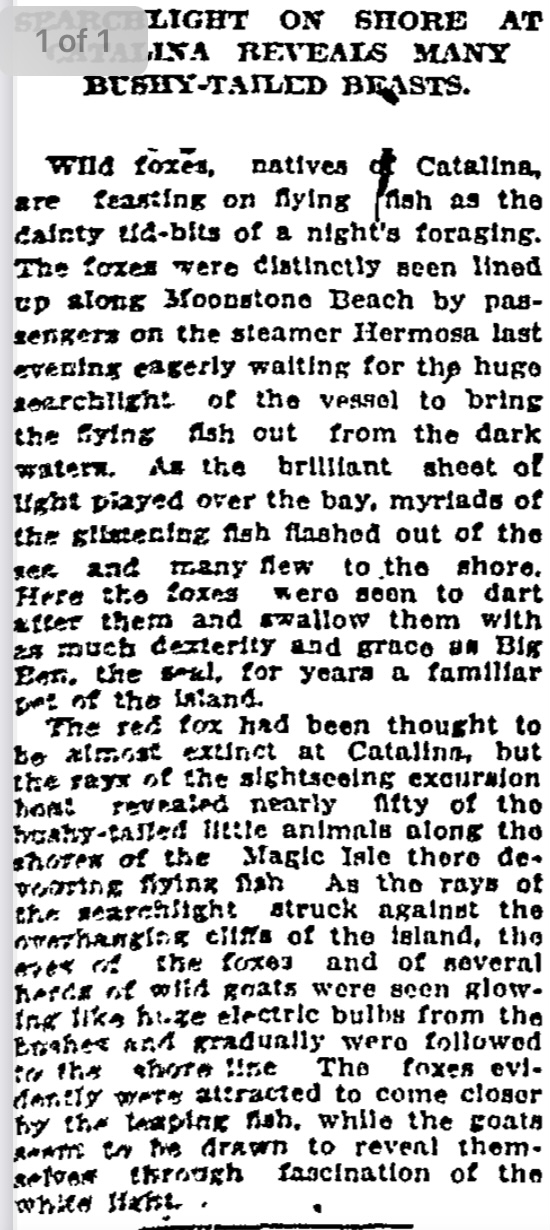
The Los Angeles Times described in 1920 island foxes lining up on a beach to wait for flying fish to jump out of the water so they could catch a free meal

The fox's preferred habitat is complex layer vegetation with a high density of woody, perennially fruiting shrubs. It lives in all of the island biomes including temperate forest, temperate grassland and chaparral, with no island supporting more than 1,000 foxes. The island fox eats fruits, insects, birds, eggs, land snails, crabs, lizards, amphibians, and small mammals, including deer mice (Peromyscus sp.), as well as human refuse. They are known to scavenge for food on beaches along the coastline.

The fox tends to move around by itself, rather than in packs. The island fox is not intimidated by humans, although at first it may show aggression. It is quite easy to tame and is generally docile. It is generally nocturnal, although with peaks of activity at dawn and dusk. Activity also fluctuates with the season; it is more active during the day in summer than it is in winter. Behavioral studies have shown that island foxes change their activity patterns when noticing human presence and changes in island development. Foxes on Santa Catalina Island have become more diurnal and are adapting to the heavy tourism on the island, and can often be seen rummaging for food on campsites. On the other hand, fox populations on more deserted islands remain mostly nocturnal. Researchers believe that this adaptability in behavior contributed to the foxes' efforts to maintain a steady population and avoid endangerment.

The island fox communicates using auditory, olfactory and visual signals. A dominant fox uses vocalizations, staring, and ear flattening to cause another fox to submit. Signs of dominance and submission are visual, such as facial expression and body posture. Its main vocalizations are barking and growling. The island fox marks territory with urine and feces.

== Climate change impacts ==
Research has identified climate change as a significant threat to the island fox and its habitat. An increased amount of drought and rising temperatures as a result of global warming have resulted in a loss of vegetation on the Channel Islands, including key sources of food for the Island fox, such as manzanita, seafigs, saltbushes, and fruits from cactus.[36] The National Park Service has since started to monitor the effects that climate change is having on food sources for the island fox as part of the Channel Islands Climate Adaptation Program initiative. While island fox populations currently remain stable, environmental experts are still concerned that the presence of prolonged droughts may continue to diminish food and water sources for the island fox for the foreseeable future.

Changes in rainfall patterns and the increased frequency of wildfires have significantly altered the habitat of the island foxes. The prolonged hot and dry seasons have increased the risk of wildfires, destroying shrubs and habitats critical to the abundance of island foxes' prey. After the devastating fire seasons in 2021 and 2023 on Santa Cruz and Santa Catalina Island, biologists recorded a significant but temporary drop in the numbers of island foxes, supporting the theory that the habitat destruction from the fires caused short term displacement of foxes. The numbers begin to stabilize once vegetation starts to grow back.

== Relationship with humans ==
The indigenous people of the Channel Islands kept island foxes as pets and used their pelts for a variety of purposes, including ceremonial headdresses. Archaeological investigations have found island foxes (often juveniles) deliberately buried, sometimes in association with human remains. These foxes are suggested to have been ritually sacrificed. The foxes play a significant role in Chumash legend.

In recent years, increased efforts have been made to intensify the conservation of island foxes and create public education for visitors of the Channel Islands. The National Park Service and Catalina Island Conservancy have established programs and projects for visitors to the island that allow them to help with fox monitoring, habitat restoration, and data collection. This strategy of ecotourism has helped contribute to local conservation funding while raising awareness of the ecological importance of the island fox.

== Conservation status and federal protection ==
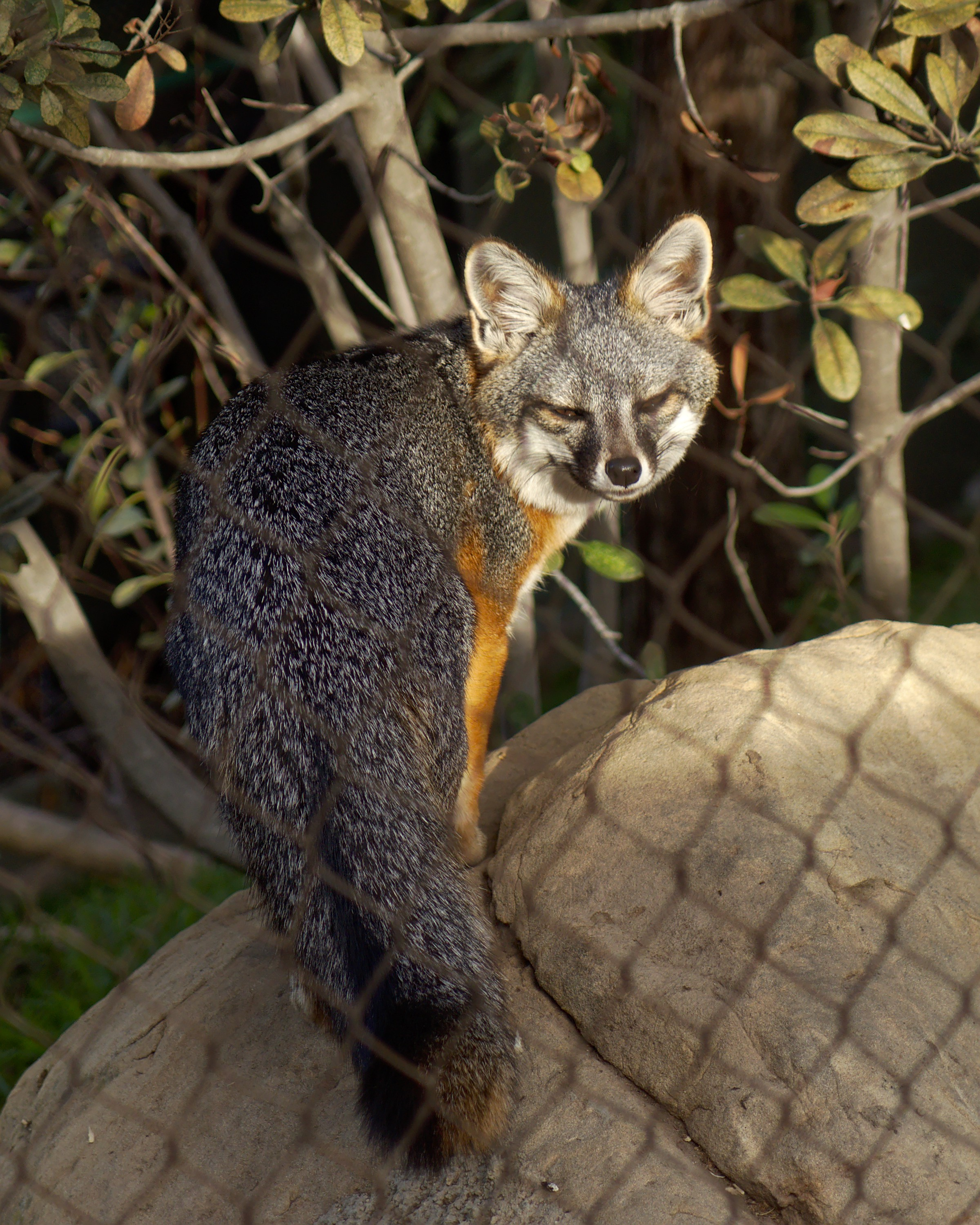
San Clemente island fox at Santa Barbara Zoo as part of a Species Survival Plan

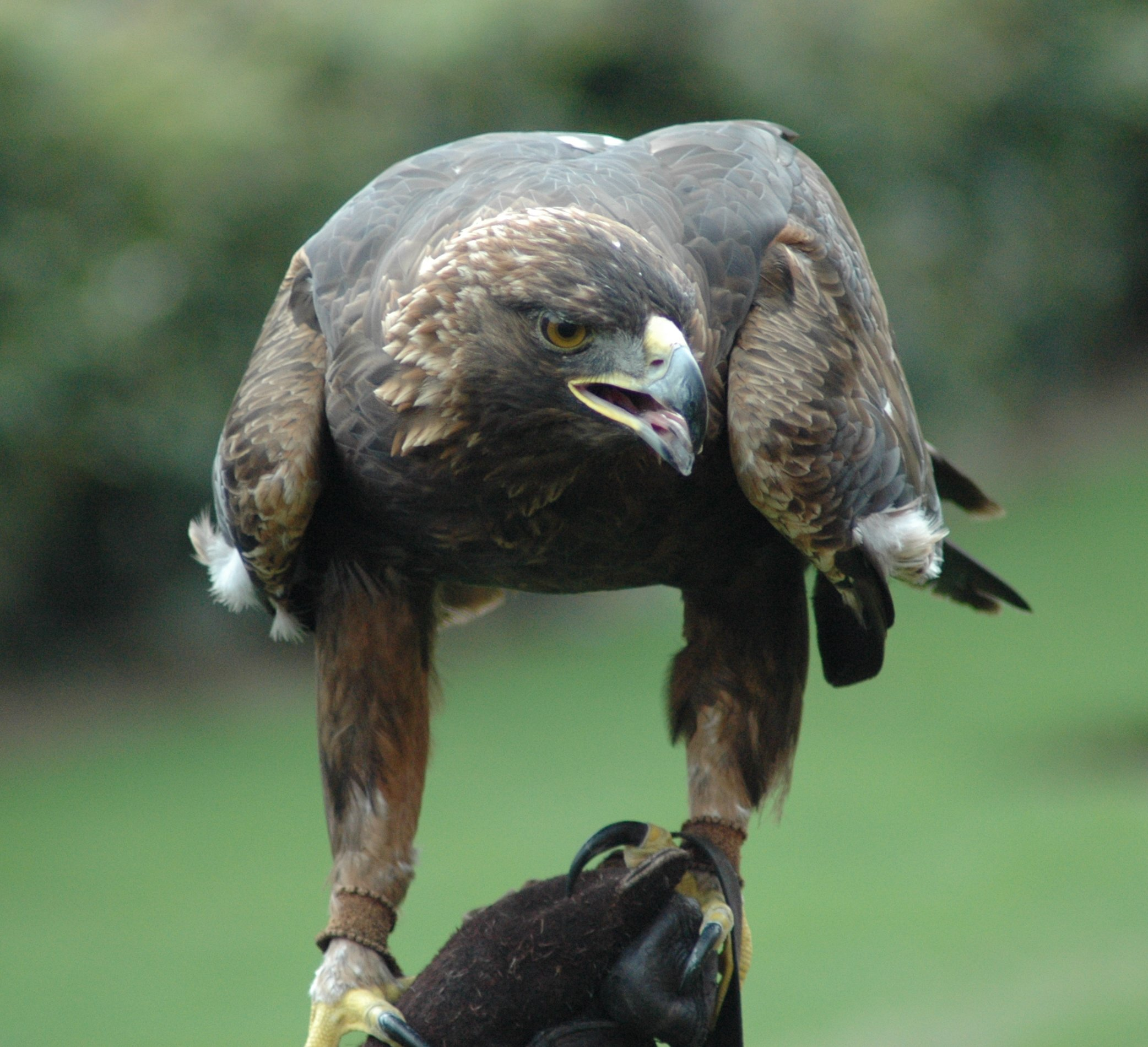
The golden eagle is four times the size of the island fox and can easily prey upon it

In March 2004, four subspecies of the island fox were classified as a federally protected endangered species: the Santa Cruz island fox, Santa Rosa island fox, San Miguel island fox and the Santa Catalina island fox. As of 2013, the IUCN lists the entire species as near threatened, an improvement from its previous status of critically endangered. A decline in island fox populations was identified in the 1990s. On San Miguel Island, the decline began in 1994, with the population falling from 450 adults to 15 by 1999. Similar population declines were discovered on Santa Cruz Island. On the Santa Cruz Island the population decreased from 2,000 adults in 1994 to less than 135 in 2000, and on Santa Rosa Island where foxes may have numbered more than 1,500 in 1994, but were reduced to 14 animals by 2000. In 2004, there were 38 San Miguel island foxes, all in captivity; 46 foxes in captivity on Santa Rosa Island and seven in the wild (golden eagle predation prevented the release of captive foxes into the wild); Santa Cruz Island had 25 captive foxes and a stable wild population of around 100 foxes.

Golden eagle predation, discovered when foxes were radio-collared and monitored, proved to be the cause of the high mortality rates. The golden eagle was an uncommon visitor to the Channel Islands before the 1990s, when it naturally colonized the area, according to data gathered by Dr. Lyndal Laughrin of the University of California Santa Cruz Island Reserve, and the first golden eagle nest was recorded on Santa Cruz Island in 1999. Biologists propose that the eagle may have been attracted to the islands in the 1960s after the decline of the bald eagle (Haliaeetus leucocephalus). The golden eagle replaced the bald eagle's niche and began to feed on feral pigs (Sus domesticus) following the devastation of the local bald eagle population due to DDT exposure in the 1950s—the bald eagle is hypothesized to have deterred the golden eagle from settling on the islands while it subsisted on fish.

The feral pigs on Santa Rosa, which themselves preyed on the foxes, were exterminated by the National Park Service in the early 1990s, which removed one of the golden eagle's food sources. The golden eagle then began to prey on the island fox population. Feral pigs on Santa Cruz Island and deer and elk on Santa Rosa Island were introduced almost 70 years prior to island fox decline, therefore, the golden eagle most likely did not seek these animals as alternative prey. This has occurred most likely as a result of a process known as apparent competition: in this process, a predator, like the golden eagle, feeds on at least two prey, for example, the island fox and feral pigs. One prey item is adapted to high predation pressure and supports the predator population (i.e. pigs), whereas the other prey item (i.e. the island fox) is poorly adapted to predation and declines as a consequence of the predation pressure. It has also been proposed that the complete removal of golden eagles may be the only action that could save three subspecies of the island fox from extinction. However, the pigs on Santa Cruz Island were killed by the Nature Conservancy on the idea that they drew the eagles to the foxes.

Introduced diseases or parasites can devastate island fox populations. Because the island fox is isolated, it has not acquired immunity to parasites and diseases brought in from the mainland and is especially vulnerable to those the domestic dog may carry. A canine distemper outbreak in 1998 killed approximately 90% of Santa Catalina Island's foxes, reducing the population from 1,300 to 103 in 2000. A vaccination program has been initiated to protect Catalina Island foxes from canine distemper. After several years of carefully trapping the foxes and vaccinating them against distemper and rabies, their population has surpassed the pre-disease population of about 1,300. Scientists believe the distemper virus was introduced by a pet dog or a raccoon from the mainland that hitched a ride on a boat or a barge. To eliminate the risk of disease, pets are not permitted in Channel Islands National Park.

Diminished food supply and general degradation of the habitat due to introduced mammal species, including feral cats (Felis catus), pigs, sheep (Ovis aries), goats (Capra hircus), and American bison (Bison bison), the last having been introduced to Catalina Island in the 1920s by a Hollywood film crew shooting a Western, also has had a negative effect on fox populations.

The foxes threaten a population of the severely endangered San Clemente Island loggerhead shrike (Lanius ludovicianus mearnsi) in residence on San Clemente Island. The island fox population has been negatively affected by trapping and removal or euthanasia of foxes by the United States Navy. Since 2000, the Navy has employed different management strategies: trapping and holding foxes during the shrike breeding season, the installation of an electric fence system around shrike habitats, and the use of shock collar systems. With the gradual recovery of the shrike population on San Clemente Island, the Navy no longer controls the foxes.

The populations of Santa Cruz island foxes, San Miguel island foxes, and Santa Rosa island foxes have dramatically rebounded from lows in 2000 of 70 for the Santa Cruz foxes and 15 each on San Miguel and Santa Rosa Islands. The Catalina Island Conservancy runs a captive breeding program on Catalina Island. On September 14, 2012, the US Fish and Wildlife Service released a draft recovery plan for the San Miguel island fox, Santa Rosa island fox, Santa Cruz island fox, and the Santa Catalina island fox. By 2012, the Catalina Island Conservancy determined that there were 1,500 Santa Catalina island foxes and the population was stable. Since then the fox populations have grown.

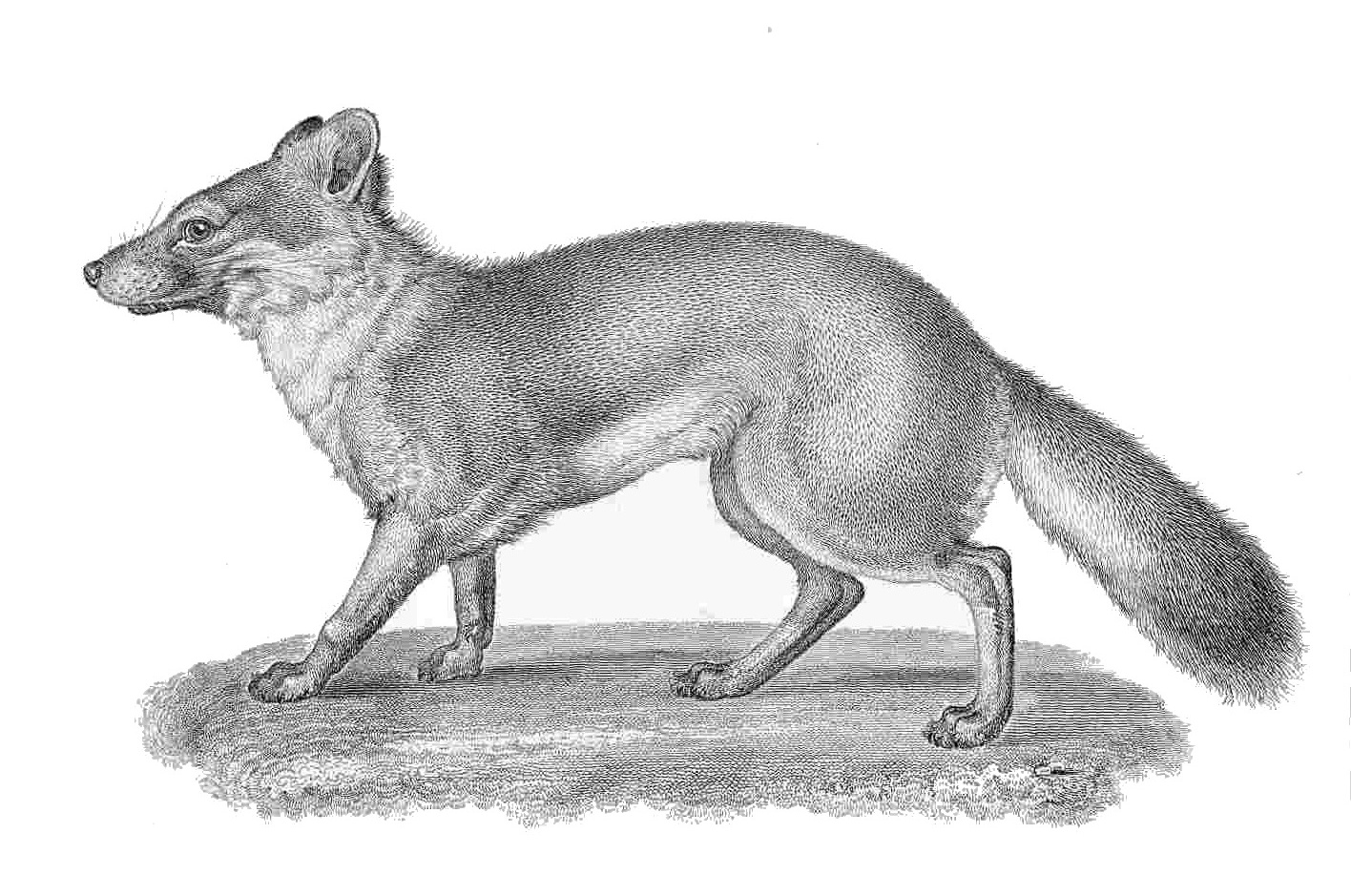
Engraving of the island fox from the Pacific Railroad survey of 1855

Island Fox Population Numbers (2025)
Channel Island Name	#'s
San Miguel	322
San Nicholas	485
Santa Rosa	2833
Santa Cruz	3086
Santa Catalina	1974
San Clemente	587

The island fox populations across the six islands have shown relative stability and moderate growth in the last 5-10 years, with more notable increases in population on Santa Cruz and Santa Rosa islands, indicating that government interventions such as disease prevention and habitat restoration have continued to support population recovery. Despite these gains, the growth in population is not reflected across all the islands. The San Clemente Island fox population remains smaller than others in comparison to its size, which could be due to the island's limited habitat area and U.S. Navy management that could restrict breeding range in certain zones, whereas San Miguel and San Nicolas Islands have maintained healthy and stable populations. Biologists from the National Park Service emphasize that continued monitoring is crucial to detect early warning signs of a population decline.

Rene Vellanoweth, an archaeologist, has proposed that inbreeding depression can be managed by mixing the different island fox subspecies populations much as the indigenous peoples did, by moving them from island to island, creating a higher genetic diversity and assisting them in recovery.

== See also ==
- Falkland Islands wolf
- Fauna of California
- List of vulnerable mammals
