= Gray fox fur =

Type of fur

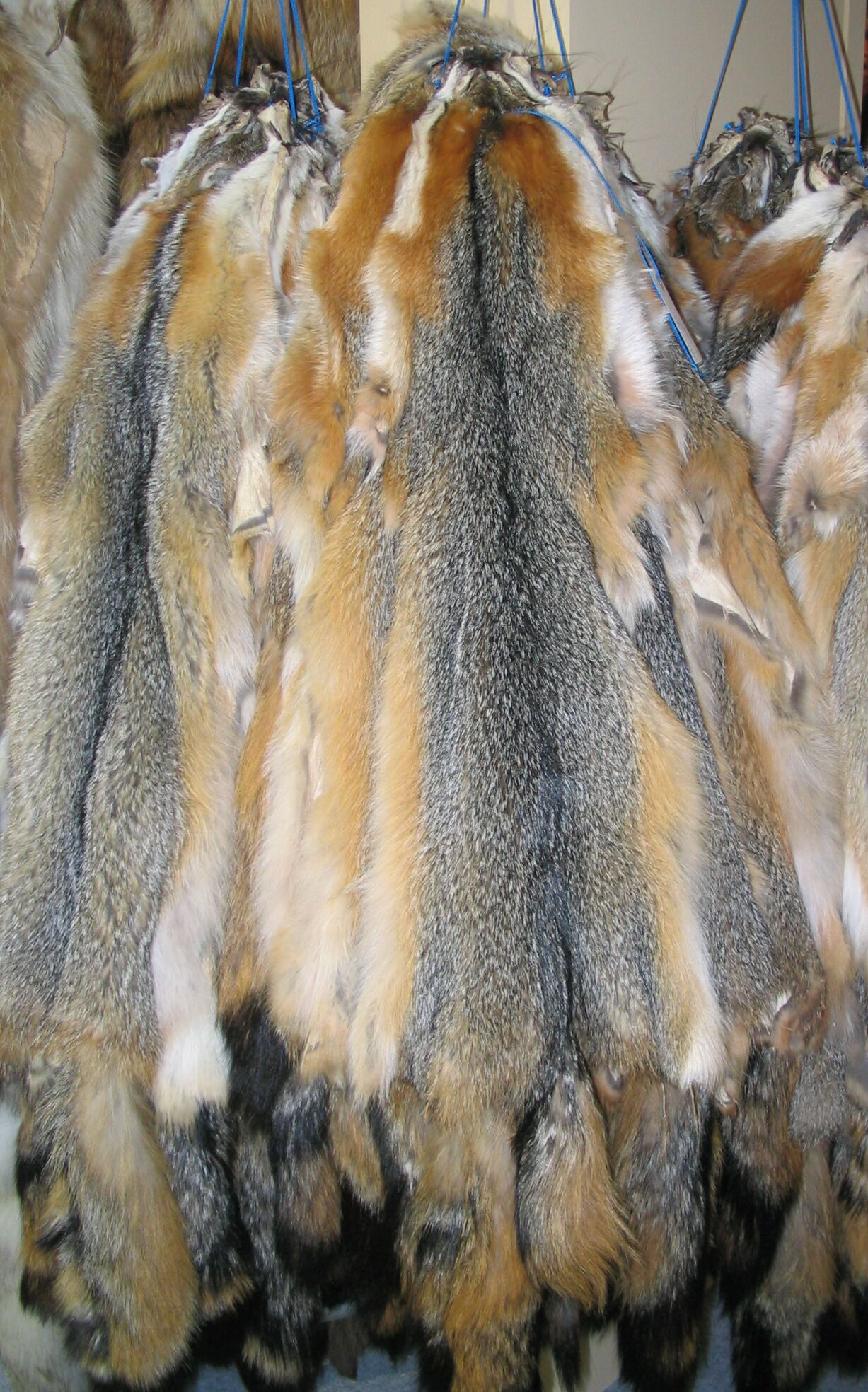
North American gray fox fur

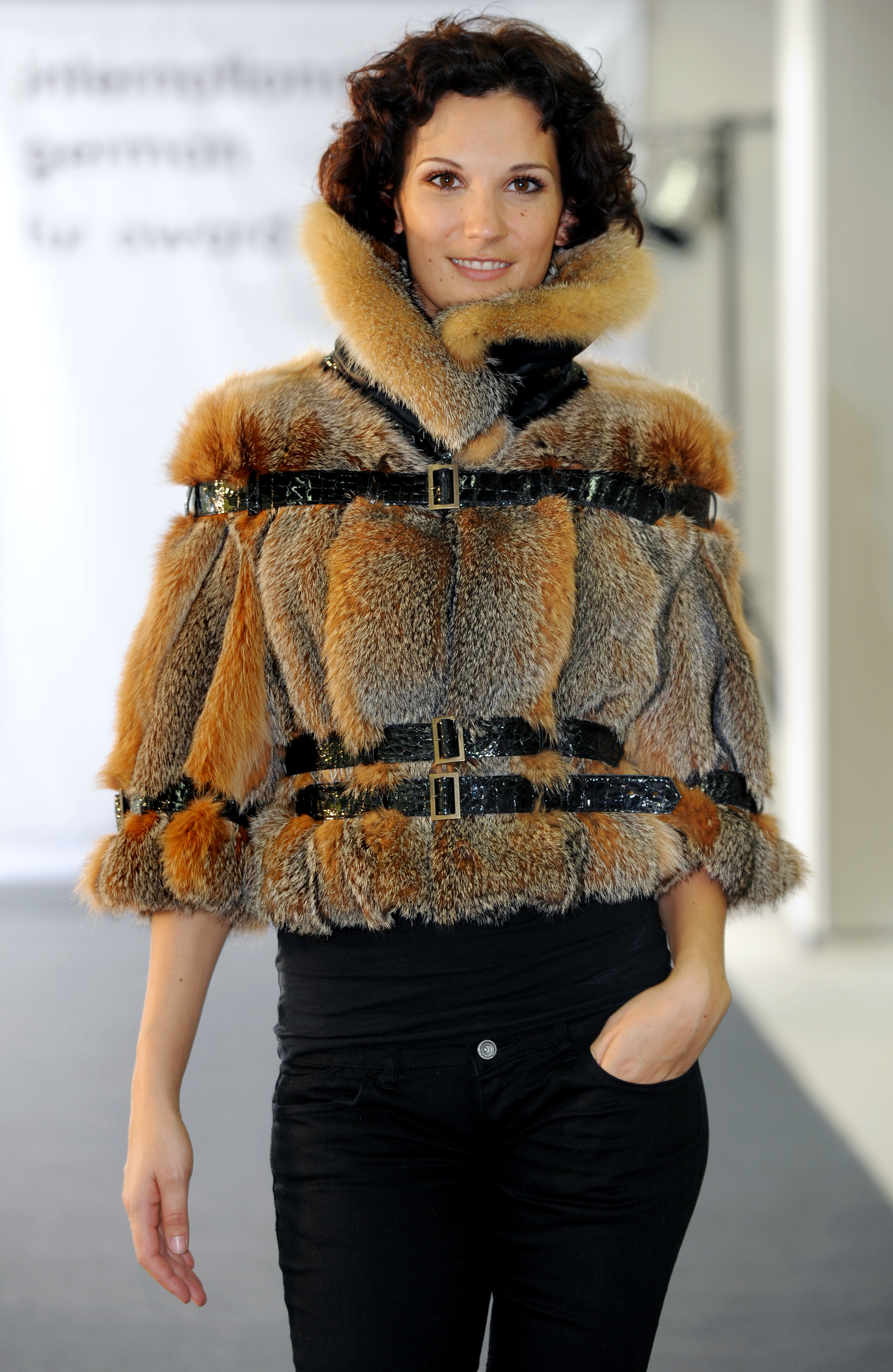
Gray fox fur jacket (Andreas Fahnenstich, 2009)

Gray fox fur is a type of fur obtained from the gray fox, a species distinguished from most other canids by its grizzled gray upper parts. It also has reddish coloration on parts of its body, including the legs, sides, feet, chest, and back, as well as on the sides of the head and neck. The white color is seen on the ears, throat, chest, belly, and hind legs. Moreover, the gray fox has a stripe of black hair that runs along the middle of its tail and ends in a black tip as well. The species occurs from southern Canada to northern South America.

== Fur ==
The gray fox fur is smaller than that of the red fox, it also has noticeably short paws, but a relatively long, thick tail. It is 53 to 73 cm (21 to 28.5 in) long, the tail is 28 to 40 cm (11 to 15.5 in) long.

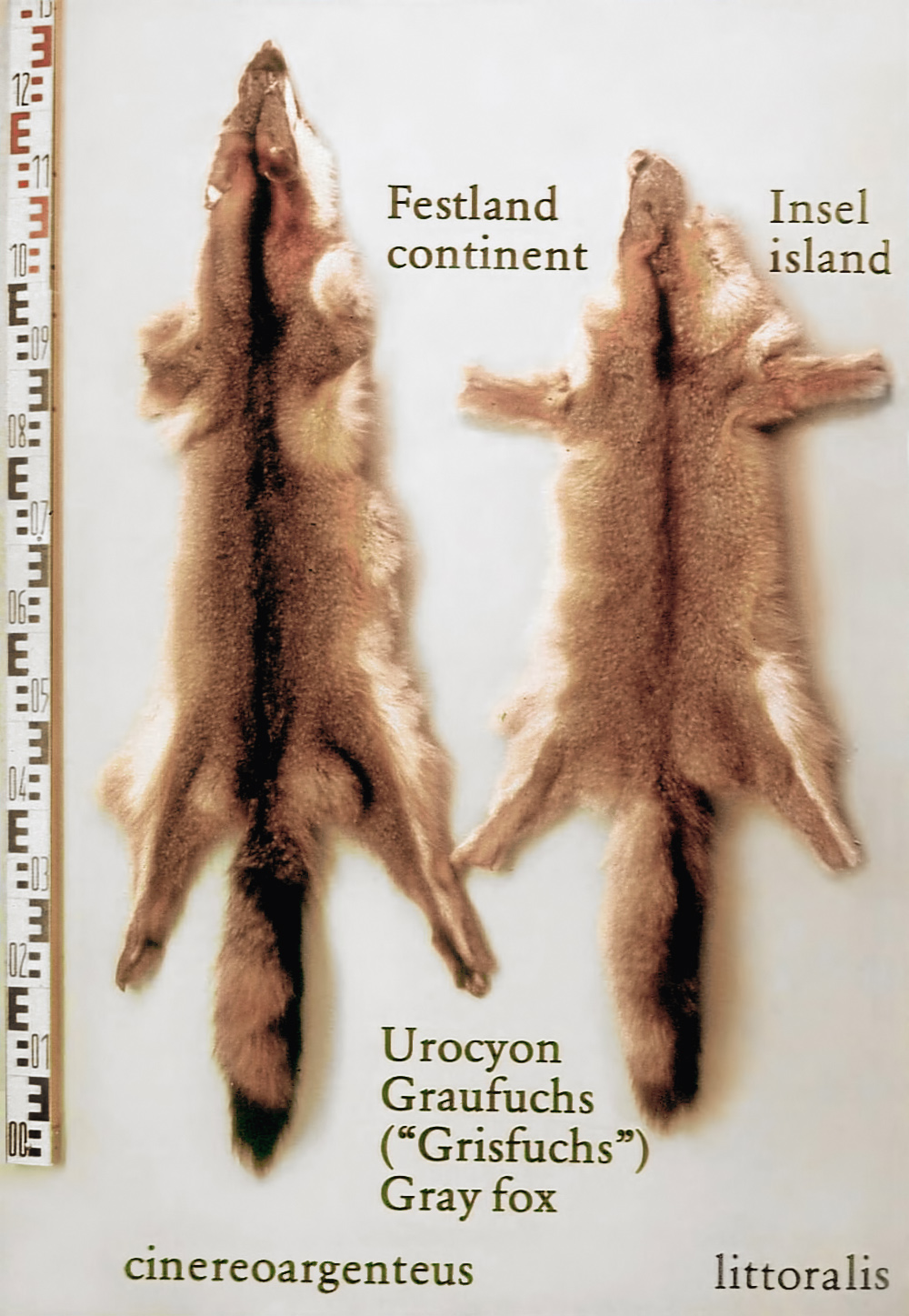
Pelts of the mainland gray fox (left) and the island gray fox with some color distortion due to aging of the photo

The guard hair is coarse and stiff and shorter compared to the red fox, and the undercoat is quite soft and very dense. Due to the black and white banding of the guard hairs, the back is pepper-and-salt-like in color, i.e. more silvery or darker gray-black, from which the animal derives its name. The cheeks, chest and dewlap are rusty yellow to copper red, the tail is grayish and has a broad, deep black stripe at the top. The hair along the middle of the back and the top of the tail looks like a black mane due to the dark hair tips. The tail hair differs from that of the red fox and other fox species, it is not regular all around, but increases in length on the underside. Depending on the occurrence or the geographical breed, there are several differences in fur size and coloration. The pelage of the newborn cub is black.

Zoologically there are two species, the much smaller and darker island gray fox and the mainland gray fox, only the latter is important for the fur trade.

The durability coefficient for gray fox fur is given as 50 to 60 percent. (Note: The comparative values (coefficients) given are the result of comparative testing by furriers and fur traders with regard to the degree of apparent wear (usage). The numbers are not unambiguous; in addition to subjective observations of durability in practice, each individual case is influenced by tanning and finishing as well as numerous other factors. A more precise figure could only be determined on a scientific basis. The classification was made in steps of 10 percent each. The most durable fur types based on practical experience were set at 100 percent.) When fur animals are divided into the fineness categories, among which are silky, fine, medium-fine, coarser and hard, gray fox hair is classified as coarser.

== Trade ==
The trade distinguishes between mainland gray foxes depending on their origin: the Eastern one (Colorado, Missouri, Texas, Rocky Mountains etc.) with short-haired silky fur, silvery back, rusty yellow dewlap and the Western one (New York State, Pennsylvania, Virginia, Georgia, etc.) with full (“heavy”) hair, blackish-gray back and up to copper red dewlap. In 1938, an even more differentiated classification was given, which include: Northern, Central, Coast and Southwestern.

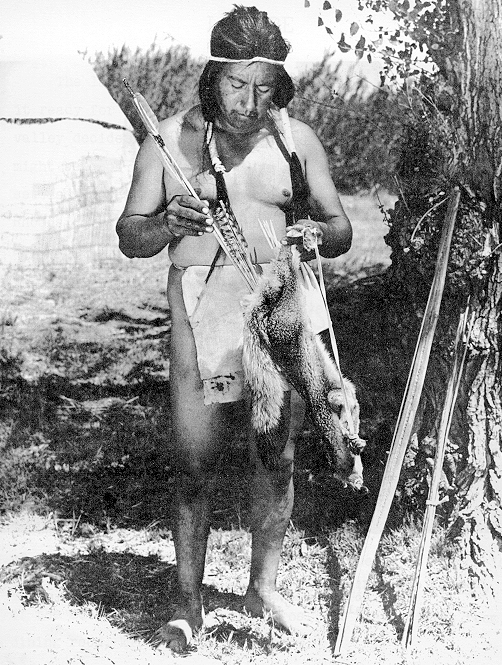
Yokute with a gray fox pelt as a quiver

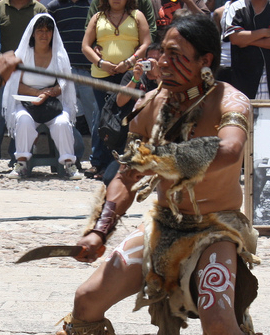
Toltec with gray fox fur embellishment, ritual dance, 2012

In addition to their area of origin, pelts are classified according to the quality of their hair density. The Eastern and Western ones have the densest fur, which allows the hair to stand upright; in the fur industry, such dense and rugged types of fur are found in contrast to furs that are flat, clinging and with thin hair density. Centrals are not as dense in the hair and therefore appear very flat. Coasts, from the coastal region, are much paler than the Centrals from the interior, but have the same structure. The other regions all supply pelts “that are too bad to be used for anything other than low-price products”.

The pelts obtained in the coldest part of winter have a soft, first-class fur, free of any bluish spots. The hair density is usually sufficient and the guard hair is significantly softer than in the lower quality levels. They belong to the best category, called the Ones or Firsts. The second category, the Twos or Seconds, originates from the season just before the height of winter. They only have a slightly bluish tint, a soft guard hair and they are almost as full in the hair as the highest quality pieces. The pelts obtained right after the coldest period also fall into this quality category; they can usually be recognized by the reddish stain on the head and shoulders and the somewhat harder skin. The even lower quality pieces are classified as the third type, Threes, and the very low, flat, undesirable pelts as the last, fourth grade, the Fours.

Another classification is based on pelt size, also in four levels: Extra Large, Large, Medium and Small. As a rule, the medium-sized coats have the softest fur and the most presentable hair pattern. This is probably due to the fact that these are mainly pelts from female animals and male foxes in their first year of life.

The rawhides are usually delivered in a round shape, with the hair facing outwards. Only the Southern and Southwestern ones were skinned open, at least until the 1930s.

After 1900, America exported 20.000 to 40.000 pelts a year; in 1923/24 the total was around 80.000; in 1950 it was 100.000 pelts. Around 1988, roughly 250.000 to 300.000 pelts were sold annually, about half of them Eastern and Western.

Gray fox fur always comes from animals in the wild. Compared to other types of fox fur, most of which come from breeding, the amount of gray fox fur is very low.

== Processing and history ==
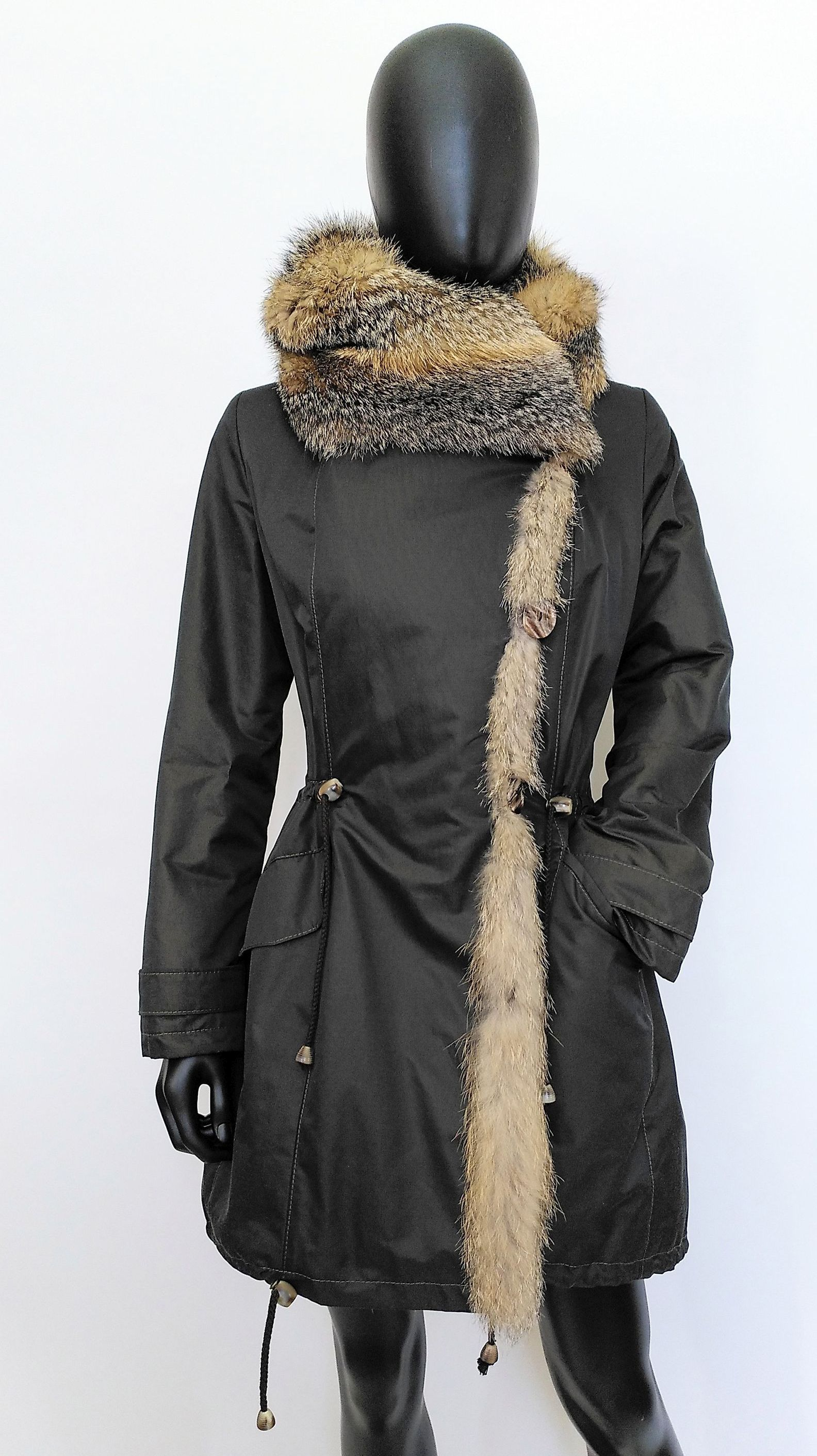
Parka with gray fox fur (Stephanie Metz, 2021)

In 1911, the fur trader Emil Brass noted: “The fur cannot be used for lining, but only for stoles and muffs. The tail and claws cannot be used for anything other than complementing stoles. Sometimes the undercoat is also dyed dark blue, while the white tips retain their color. The current average value is about 10 marks per pelt.” In 1940, the Leipzig-based magazine “Kürschner-Zeitung” wrote “...they are natural or dyed blue and made into ties, chokers, hunting muffs and blankets, and recently also occasionally into jackets and capes”. In 1986, in a scholarly book, it was said, in complete contrast to Brass, but obviously now very outdated in terms of its use, that the gray fox was of little value due to its short, rough hair and “is used for the lining of travel furs”. (Note: Travel furs are furs that were worn on journeys in the then unheated carriages, sledges, railroads and later automobiles to protect against the cold.)

The fur, which is quite short-haired for a fox with its vibrant coloration, was also used a lot for jackets and coats after the Second World War and, since around the 1990s, increasingly for bindings and hood trimmings, sometimes dyed in fashionable colors. Even today, the natural color structure is retained during dyeing, as the hard guard hair takes on the color to a much lesser extent than the soft undercoat.

Since the introduction of the fur sewing machine around 1900 (invented around 1870), it has been possible to change the shape of furs as desired at a reasonable cost by means of the process known as letting out. Narrow V- or A-shaped cuts are used to cut the pelts to any desired length at the expense of width, right down to a floor-length evening coat (see photo).

As is the case with almost all types of fur, the off-cuts of the gray fox, especially the paws and sides, are put together to form plates (Note: In the jargon, “plates” are scraps of fur (usually left after pelts are trimmed) that are sewn together.) and are sent to the wholesale trade for further processing as so-called bodies (semi-finished products). The main place for recycling the fur waste produced in Europe is Kastoria in Greece and the smaller town of Siatista nearby. The tails are used as pendants for key rings, bags, etc., and also as boas when fashionable, although they are less soft and have a smaller volume than the tails of most other fox species.
