= 58th Oregon Legislative Assembly =

←	57th Legislative Assembly	59th Legislative Assembly	→
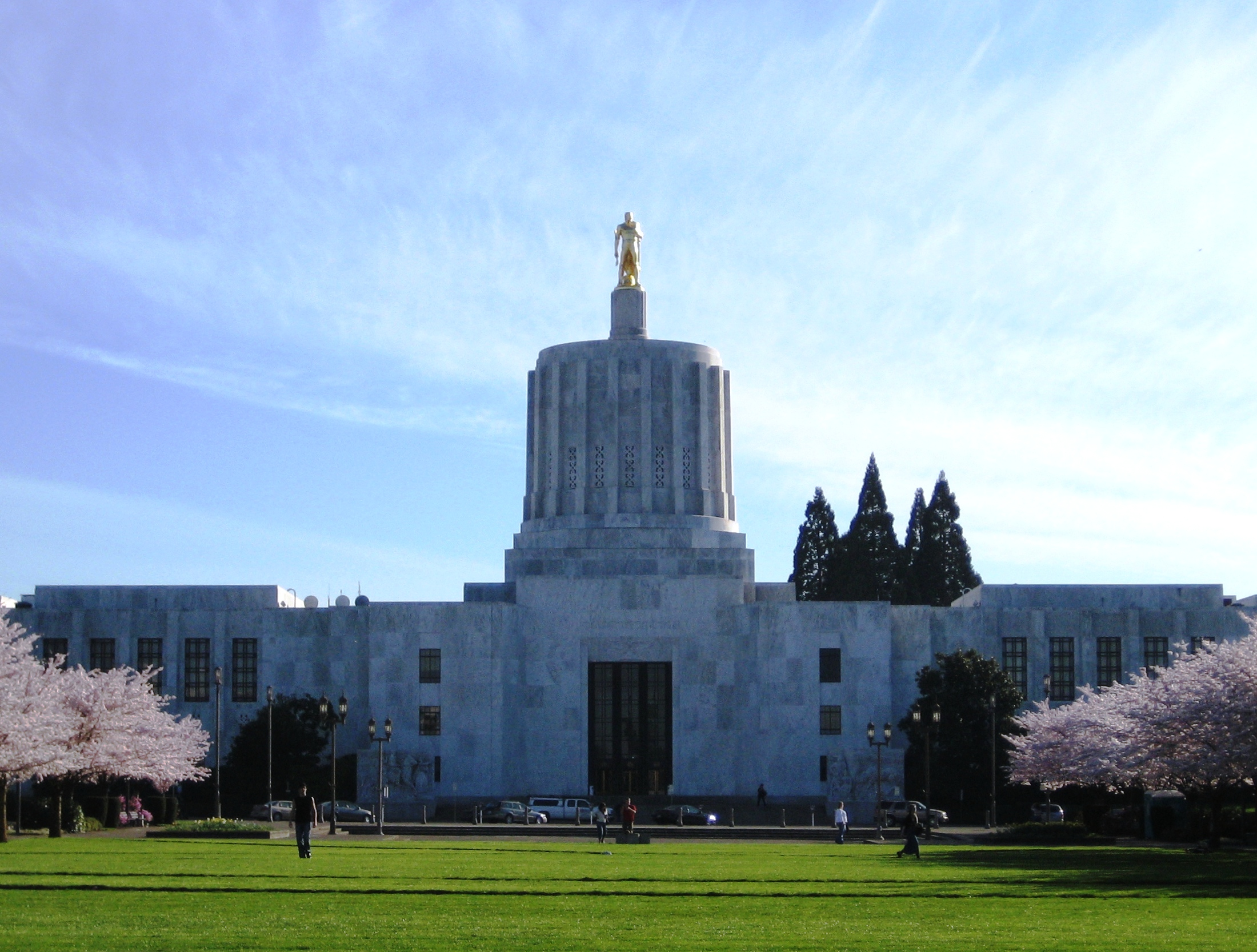
- The legislature took place in the Oregon State Capitol, seen here in 2007

Overview
- Legislative body: Oregon Legislative Assembly
- Jurisdiction: Oregon, United States
- Meeting place: Oregon State Capitol
- Term: 1975
- Website: www.oregonlegislature.gov

Oregon State Senate
- Members: 30 Senators
- Senate President: Jason Boe (D)
- Majority Leader: Fred W. Heard (D)
- Minority Leader: Victor Atiyeh (R)
- Party control: Democratic Party of Oregon

Oregon House of Representatives
- Members: 60 Representatives
- Speaker of the House: Phil Lang (D)
- Majority Leader: Ed Lindquist (D)
- Minority Leader: Roger E. Martin (R)
- Party control: Democratic Party of Oregon

The 58th Legislative Assembly of the U.S. state of Oregon convened on January 13, 1975 for its regular session, and for a one-day special session in September 1975. The Senate and House were both controlled by the Democratic Party.

== Senate ==
Affiliation	Members
Democratic	22
Republican	7
Independent (Note: Charles Hanlon was an independent, but later became a Democrat in 1976.)	1
Total	30

== Senate Members ==
Composition of the Senate
District	Senator	Party
4	Victor Atiyeh	Republican
23	Jason Boe	Democratic
13	Walter F. Brown	Democratic
22	Elizabeth W. Browne	Democratic
17	Keith A. Burbidge	Democratic
16	Wallace P. Carson Jr.	Republican
12	Vernon Cook	Democratic
21	Edward Fadeley	Democratic
14	Richard E. Groener	Democratic
5	Ted Hallock	Democratic
1	Charles Hanlon (Note: Independent, later became a Democrat in 1976)	Independent
26	Lenn Hannon	Democratic
27	Fred W. Heard	Democratic
7	Norman R. Howard	Democratic
28	Kenneth Jernstedt	Republican
6	Loyal Lang	Democratic
8	William McCoy	Democratic
15	Anthony Meeker	Republican
2	Stan Ouderkirk	Republican
25	Eugene "Debbs" Potts	Democratic
19	John A. Powell	Democratic
24	Jack Ripper	Democratic
10	Betty Roberts	Democratic
9	Frank L. Roberts	Democratic
11	Mary Wendy Roberts	Democratic
30	Bob Smith	Republican
29	Michael G. Thorne	Democratic
18	Clifford W. Trow	Democratic
3	Blaine Whipple	Democratic
20	George F. Wingard	Republican

== House ==
Affiliation	Members
Democratic	40
Republican	20
Total	60

== House Members ==
Composition of the House
District	House Member	Party
22	Harvey Akeson	Democratic
11	Earl Blumenauer	Democratic
46	Dick Bonebrake	Democratic
29	Stan Bunn	Republican
41	Mary Burrows	Republican
37	Bernard Byers	Democratic
14	Howard Cherry	Democratic
15	Jim Chrest (Note: Chrest was appointed to the house, replacing McCoy who resigned to accept an appointment to the senate.)	style="color:black;background-color:#B0CEFF" |Democratic
15	William McCoy	style="color:black;background-color:#B0CEFF" |Democratic
20	Drew Davis	Democratic
50	Albert H. Densmore	Democratic
32	Margaret Dereli	Democratic
42	Nancie Fadeley	Democratic
4	Bill B. Ferguson	Democratic
33	Clinton D. Forbes	Democratic
40	David B. Frohnmayer	Democratic
30	Jeff Gilmour	Democratic
47	William Grannell	Democratic
27	Ralph Groener	Democratic
21	Richard Gustafson	Democratic
36	William F. Gwinn	Republican
3	Paul Hanneman	Republican
49	Cecil L. Johnson	Republican
54	Samuel S. Johnson	Republican
60	Denny Jones	Republican
13	Stephen Kafoury	Democratic
8	Vera Katz	Democratic
39	Grattan Kerans	Democratic
18	Lloyd Kinsey	Republican
43	Ted Kulongoski	Democratic
10	Phil Lang	Democratic
26	Ed Lindquist	Democratic
1	Dick Magruder	Democratic
5	Tom Marsh	Democratic
24	Roger E. Martin	Republican
34	Robert Marx	Democratic
15	William McCoy	Democratic
57	Wallace W. McCrae	Republican
52	Cleatis G. Mitchell	Democratic
51	Brad Morris	Republican
19	Hardy Myers	Democratic
23	Glenn E. Otto	Democratic
58	E. E. Patterson	Republican
31	Norma Paulus	Republican
12	Grace Olivier Peck	Democratic
16	Wally Priestley	Democratic
6	Mike Ragsdale	Republican
9	Mary Rieke	Republican
44	Bill Rogers	Republican
59	Max Simpson	Democratic
17	George W. Starr	Democratic
48	Edward Stevenson	Democratic
45	Robert M. Stults	Republican
55	Jack Sumner	Democratic
35	Antone C. VanVilet	Republican
56	Paul E. Walden	Republican
25	Glen W. Whallon	Democratic
7	Pat Whiting	Democratic
53	Gary Wilhelms	Republican
28	Curtis Wolfer	Democratic
2	William W. Wyatt	Democratic
