= 56th Oregon Legislative Assembly =

←	55th Legislative Assembly	57th Legislative Assembly	→
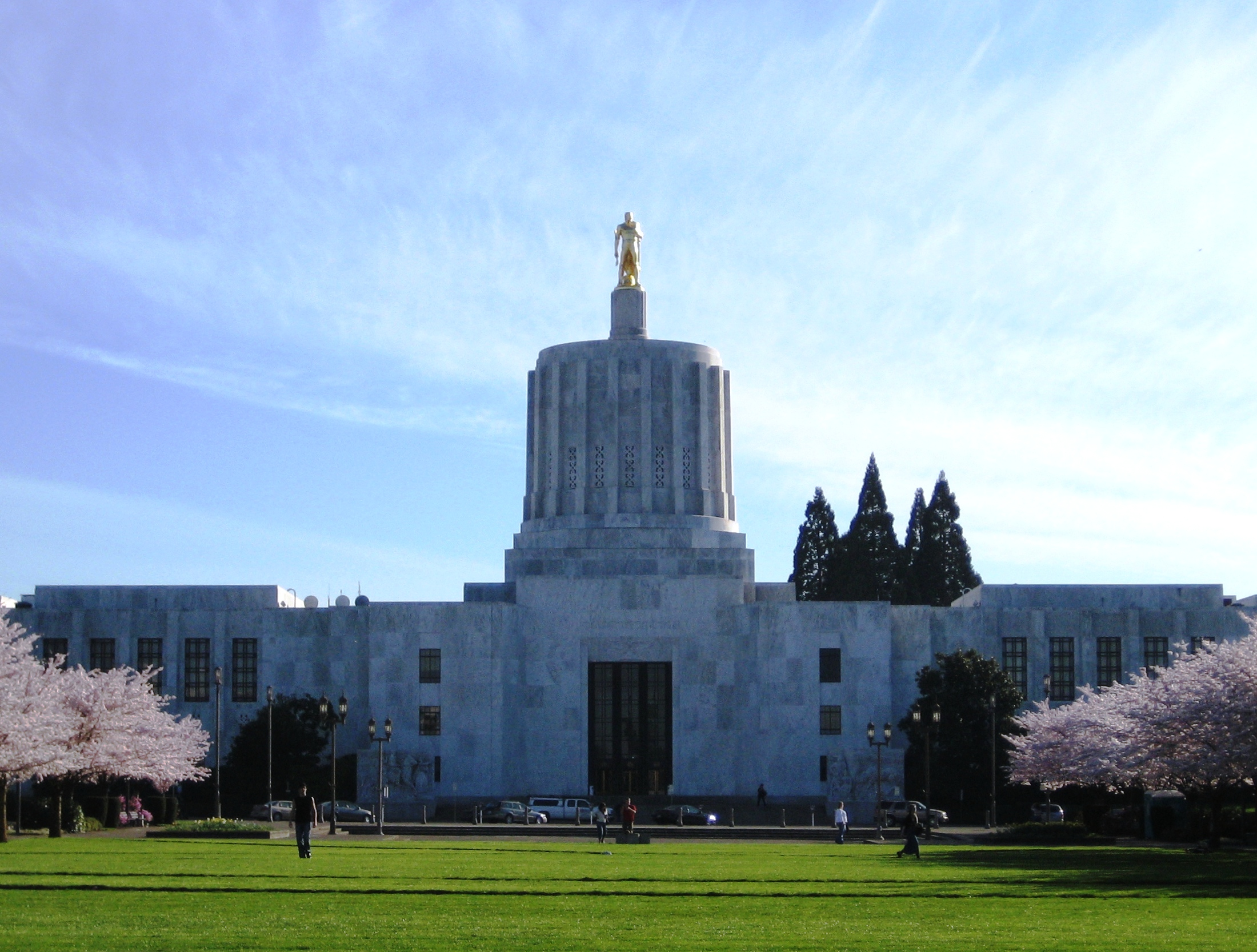
- The legislature took place in the Oregon State Capitol, seen here in 2007

Overview
- Legislative body: Oregon Legislative Assembly
- Jurisdiction: Oregon, United States
- Meeting place: Oregon State Capitol
- Term: 1971
- Website: www.oregonlegislature.gov

Oregon State Senate
- Members: 30 Senators
- Senate President: John D. Burns (D)
- President Pro Tempore: Harry D. Boivin (D)
- Party control: Democratic Party of Oregon

Oregon House of Representatives
- Members: 60 Representatives
- Speaker of the House: Robert Smith
- Speaker Pro Tempore: Roger E. Martin (R)
- Party control: Republican Party of Oregon

The 56th Oregon Legislative Assembly convened for its regular session in 1971. The Democratic Party of Oregon held the majority in the Oregon State Senate, and the Oregon Republican Party held the majority in the Oregon House of Representatives. Republican Tom McCall was the Governor of Oregon.

According to a biography of McCall, the two most significant legislative efforts during the session were the Oregon Bottle Bill, which passed, and a bill to "thwart migrant farm workers' attempts to form labor unions," which McCall vetoed.

== Senate ==
Affiliation	Members
Democratic	16
Republican	14
Total	30
Government Majority	2

== Senate Members ==
Composition of the Senate
Senator	Residence	Party
Victor Atiyeh	Portland	Republican
Jack Bain	Portland	Democratic
Jason D. Boe	Reedsport	Democratic
Harry D. Boivin	Klamath Falls	Democratic
E. W. Browne	Oakridge	Democratic
Keith A. Burbridge	Salem	Democratic
John D. Burns	Portland	Democratic
Wallace P. Carson Jr.	Salem	Republican
Vernon Cook	Gresham	Democratic
Sam Dement	Myrtle Point	Republican
George Eivers	Milwaukie	Republican
Edward Fadeley	Eugene	Democratic
Richard E. Groener	Milwaukie	Democratic
Harl H. Haas Jr. (Note: Ted Hallock resigned his seat. Haas resigned from the house on May 11, 1971 to accept an appointment to Hallock's seat)	Portland	Democratic
Ted Hallock	Portland	Democratic
Tom Hartung	Portland	Republican
William H. Holmstrom	Gearhart	Democratic
C. R. Hoyt	Corvallis	Republican
Kenneth Jernstedt	Hood River	Republican
Berkeley Lent	Portland	Democratic
Hector Macpherson Jr.	Albany	Republican
Gordon W. McKay	Bend	Republican
L. W. Newbry	Talent	Republican
W. Ouderkirk	Newport	Republican
Eugene "Debbs" Potts	Grants Pass	Democratic
Raphael R. Raymond	Helix	Republican
Betty Roberts	Portland	Democratic
Don S. Willner	Lake Oswego	Democratic
George F. Wingard	Eugene	Republican
Anthony Yturri	Ontario	Republican

== House ==
Affiliation	Members
Democratic	26
Republican	34
Total	60
Government Majority	8

== House Members ==
Composition of the House
District	House Member	Party
Harvey Akeson	Portland	Democratic
Jack W. Anunsen	Salem	Republican
Les AuCoin	Forest Grove	Democratic
Sidney Bazett	Grants Pass	Republican
Keith Burns (Note: Haas resigned on May 11, 1971 to accept an appointment to the Senate. Burns was appointed the day after on May 12 to fill Haas' seat.)	Portland	Democratic
Harl H. Haas Jr.	Portland	Democratic
Bud Byers	Albany	Democratic
Howard L. Cherry	Portland	Democratic
Fritzi Chuinard	Portland	Republican
George F. Cole	Seaside	Democratic
Walter R. Collett	Salem	Republican
Jack Craig	Eugene	Democratic
Morris K. Crothers	Salem	Republican
Albert H. Densmore	Medford	Democratic
Robert A. Elliott	Portland	Republican
Richard O. Eymann	Springfield	Democratic
Nancie Fadeley	Eugene	Democratic
Douglas W. Graham	Portland	Republican
William F. Gwinn	Amity	Republican
Paul Hanneman	Cloverdale	Republican
Stafford Hansell	Hermiston	Republican
Fred W. Heard	Klamath Falls	Democratic
Jim Henderson	Lake Oswego	Republican
Marvin J. Hollingsworth	Troutdale	Democratic
Norman R. Howard	Portland	Democratic
Carrol B. Howe	Klamath Falls	Republican
Robert C. Ingalls	Corvallis	Republican
Leigh Thronton Johnson	Ashland	Republican
Sam Johnson	Redmond	Republican
Richard Kennedy	Eugene	Democratic
Lloyd C. Kinsey	Portland	Republican
Phil Lang	Portland	Democratic
Gordon L. Macpherson	Waldport	Republican
Dick Magruder	Clatskanie	Democratic
Ken Maher	Portland	Democratic
Irvin Mann	Stanfield	Republican
William E. Markham	Riddle	Republican
Roger E. Martin	Lake Oswego	Republican
Hugh McGilvra	Forest Grove	Republican
Roderick T. McKenzie	Sixes	Republican
Anthony Meeker	Amity	Republican
Clayton Nybert	Tualatin	Republican
LeRoy D. Owens	Eugene	Democratic
E. E. Patterson	LaGrande	Republican
Norma Paulus	Salem	Republican
Grace Olivier Peck	Portland	Democratic
Laurence P. Perry	Eugene	Democratic
Allen B. Pynn	West Linn	Republican
Mary W. Rieke	Portland	Republican
Jack Ripper	North Bend	Democratic
Frank L. Roberts	Portland	Democratic
Keith Skelton	Portland	Democratic
Robert F. Smith	Burns	Republican
Donald L. Stathos	Jacksonville	Republican
William H. Stevenson	Portland	Democratic
Robert M. Stults	Roseburg	Republican
Leo M. Thornton	Milwaukie	Republican
Paul E. Walden	Hood River	Republican
Howard Willits	Portland	Democratic
Martin F. Wolfer	Salem	Democratic
Thomas F. Young	Baker	Republican
