= 57th Oregon Legislative Assembly =

Legislature of Oregon, U.S., 1973–1974

←	56th Legislative Assembly	58th Legislative Assembly	→
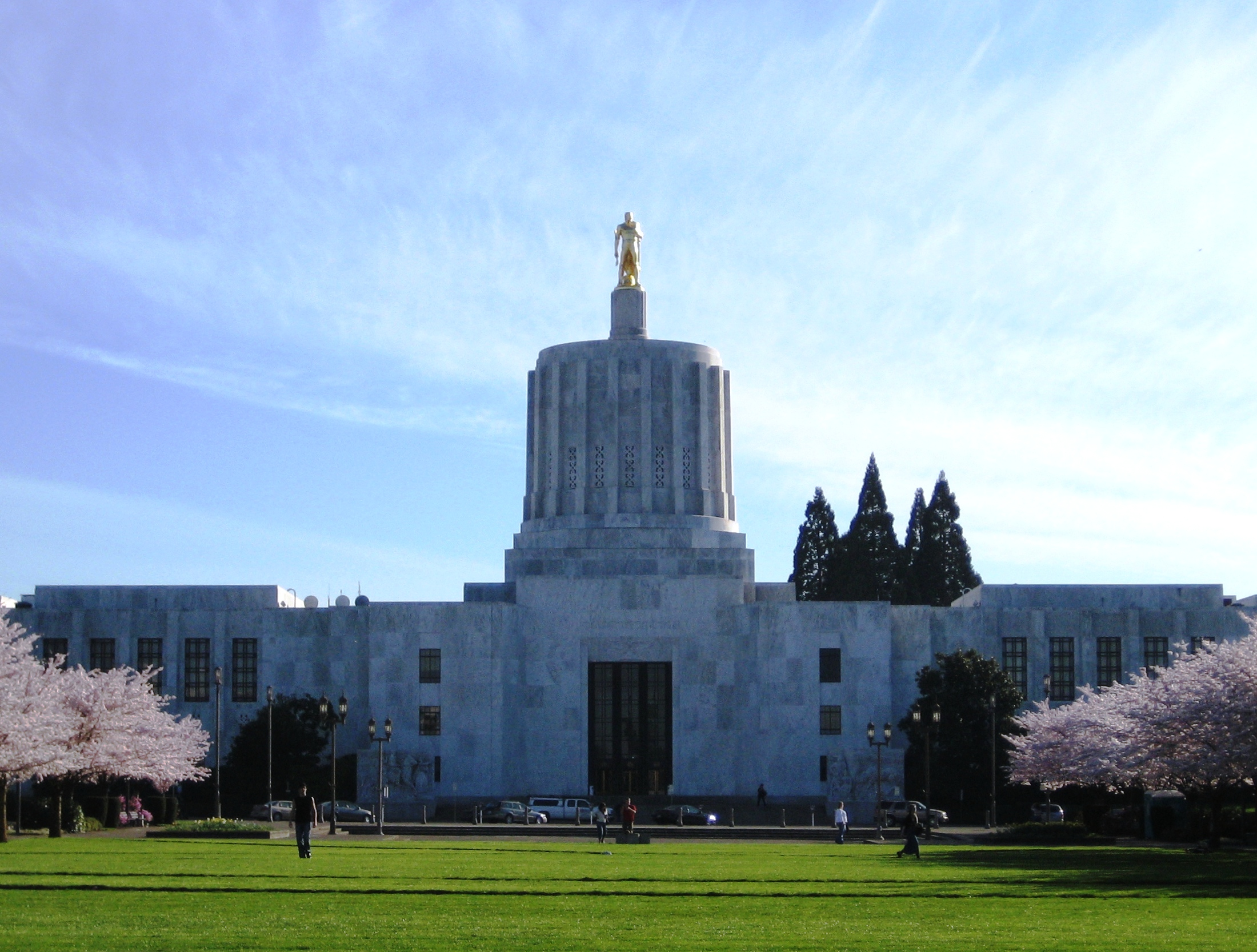
- The legislature took place in the Oregon State Capitol, seen here in 2007

Overview
- Legislative body: Oregon Legislative Assembly
- Jurisdiction: Oregon, United States
- Meeting place: Oregon State Capitol
- Term: 1973-1974

Oregon State Senate
- Members: 30 Senators
- Senate President: Jason Boe
- President Pro Tempore: Richard E. Groener
- Majority Leader: Bill Holmstrom
- Minority Leader: Victor Atiyeh
- Party control: Democratic Party

Oregon House of Representatives
- Members: 60 Representatives
- Speaker of the House: Richard Eymann
- Speaker Pro Tempore: Phil Lang
- Majority Leader: Les AuCoin
- Minority Leader: Gordon L. Macpherson
- Party control: Democratic Party

The 57th Oregon Legislative Assembly convened for its regular session from January 8 to July 6, 1973. There was also a special session from January 24 to February 24, 1974.

Both houses were controlled by the Democratic Party of Oregon. The House speaker was Richard Eymann. Jason Boe was the Senate president; Eymann would serve as Speaker only during the 57th legislature; Boe would continue as President through the 1980 special session.

Republican Tom McCall was governor during the 57th legislature.

The 57th legislature passed sweeping legislation, most notably Senate Bill 100, which established a framework for land use planning in the state.

Bill McCoy, the first African American elected to Oregon's legislature, served his first term in the House during this session. He was later appointed to the Oregon Senate.

== Senate ==
Affiliation	Members
Democratic	18
Republican	12
Total	30
Government Majority	6

== Senate members ==
Composition of the Senated
District	Senator	Party
4	Victor Atiyeh	Republican
23	Jason Boe	Democratic
22	Elizabeth Browne	Democratic
17	Keith A. Burbridge	Democratic
11	John D. Burns	Democratic
6	Keith Burns (Note: Resigned November 30, 1974)	Democratic
16	Wallace P. Carson Jr.	Republican
12	Vernon Cook	Democratic
13	George Eivers	Republican
20	Edward Fadeley	Democratic
14	Richard Groener	Democratic
5	Ted Hallock	Democratic
3	Tom Hartung	Republican
27	Fred W. Heard	Democratic
1	Bill Holmstrom	Democratic
7	Norman R. Howard	Democratic
18	Dick Hoyt	Republican
28	Kenneth Jernstedt	Republican
19	Hector Macpherson Jr.	Republican
9	Thomas R. Mahoney	Democratic
15	Anthony Meeker	Republican
26	Lynn Newbry	Republican
2	Stan Ouderkirk	Republican
25	Eugene "Debbs" Potts	Democratic
24	Jack Ripper	Democratic
10	Betty Roberts	Democratic
30	Bob Smith	Republican
8	Bill Stevenson (Note: Resigned December 15, 1974)	Democratic
29	Michael G. Thorne	Democratic
21	George F. Wingard	Republican

== House ==
Affiliation	Members
Democratic	33
Republican	27
Total	60
Government Majority	5

== House members ==
Composition of the House
District	House member	Party
22	Harvey Akeson	Democratic
4	Les AuCoin	Democratic
49	Sidney Bazett	Republican
11	Earl Blumenauer	Democratic
29	Stan Bunn	Republican
41	Mary Burrows	Republican
37	Bernard Byers	Democratic
14	Howard L. Cherry	Democratic
2	George F. Cole	Democratic
50	Albert H. Densmore	Democratic
32	Margaret Dereli	Democratic
17	Robert A. Elliott	Republican
44	Richard O. Eymann	Democratic
42	Nancie Fadeley	Democratic
30	Jeff Gilmour	Democratic
47	William Grannell	Democratic
27	Ralph Groener	Democratic
36	William F. Gwinn	Republican
5	Lewis B. Hampton	Republican
3	Paul A. Hanneman	Republican
57	Stafford Hansell	Republican
35	Robert C. Ingalls	Republican
52	Leigh Thronton Johnson	Republican
54	Sam Johnson	Republican
60	Denny Jones	Republican
13	Stephen Kafoury	Democratic
8	Vera Katz	Democratic
18	Lloyd C. Kinsey	Republican
10	Phil Lang	Democratic
26	Ed Lindquist	Democratic
38	Gordon l. MacPherson	Republican
1	Dick Magruder	Democratic
46	William E. Markham	Republican
24	Roger E. Martin	Republican
34	Robert Marx	Democratic
15	William McCoy	Democratic
51	Brad Morris	Republican
59	Donald Oakes	Republican
23	Glenn E. Otto	Democratic
58	E. E. Patterson	Republican
31	Norma Paulus	Republican
12	Grace Olivier Peck	Democratic
40	Laurence P. Perry	Democratic
16	Wally Priestley	Democratic
6	Mike Ragsdale	Republican
9	Mary W. Rieke	Republican
20	Mary Wendy Roberts	Democratic
19	Keith Skelton	Democratic
48	Edward Stevenson	Democratic
43	David Stults	Republican
45	Robert M. Stults	Republican
55	Jack Sumner	Democratic
56	Paul E. Walden	Republican
25	Glen Whallon	Democratic
39	Wayne Whitehead	Republican
7	Pat Whiting	Democratic
53	Gary Wilhelms	Republican
21	Howard Willits	Democratic
28	Curtis Wolfer	Democratic
33	Martin F. Wolfer	Democratic

== See also ==
- List of Oregon ballot measures#1973
