= Plaid Pantry =

American chain of convenience stores

Plaid Pantries, Inc.
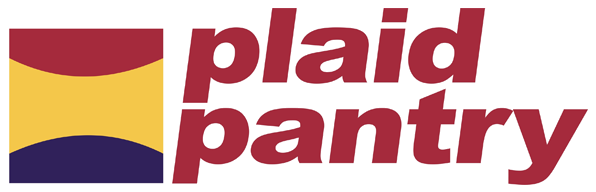

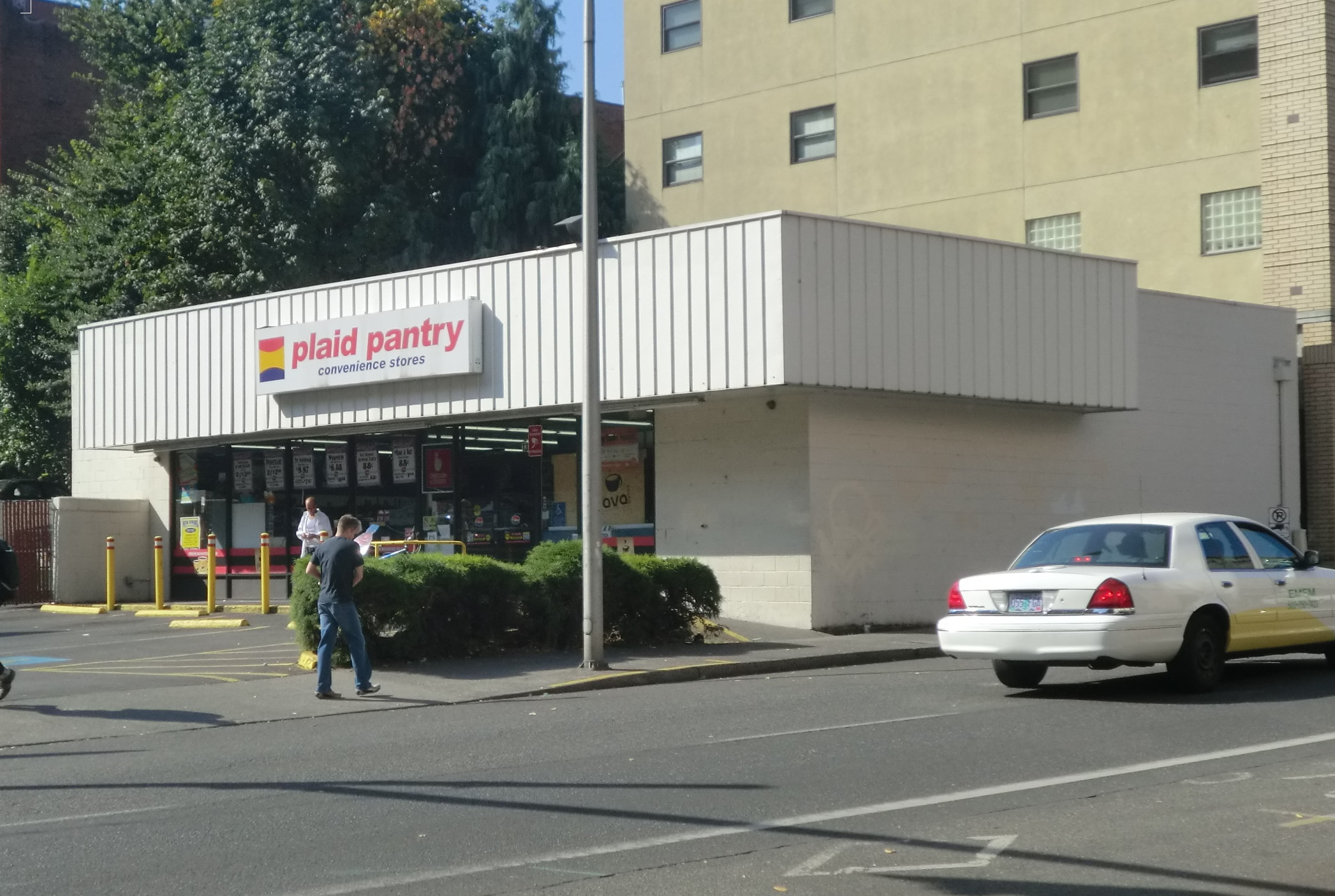
- A Plaid Pantry in Portland, Oregon
- Trade name: Plaid Pantry
- Type: Privately held company
- Founded: 1963; 63 years ago
- Founder: John Piacentini
- Headquarters: Portland, Oregon, U.S.
- Area served: Portland metropolitan area, Salem, Oregon, Seattle metropolitan area
- Key people: Jonathan Polonsky (President and CEO), Brent Chadwick (CFO)
- Revenue: $200 million (as of 2022)
- Website: www.plaidpantry.com

Plaid Pantry, stylized as plaid pantry, is a chain of privately owned convenience stores in Oregon and Washington. There are 107 locations, primarily in the Portland metropolitan area with other locations in the Salem and Seattle areas.

== History ==
Plaid Pantries, Inc. traces its founding to 1960 by John Piacentini. The name refers to the plaid decoration originally on both the store buildings and the roadside pole signs.

=== Founder's sale and death ===
Nearly 20 years later, when Piacentini tentatively sold the company to Convenient Food Mart (CFM) in March 1987, he had built it into a chain of 161 stores in the Portland and Seattle areas. That sale fell through about two months later, after CFM conducted its due diligence audit. A subsequent leveraged buyout a year later led to chapter 11 bankruptcy on March 13, 1989, and a subsequent reorganization. Piacentini died later in 1988, and several lawsuits followed.

=== Since 1991 ===
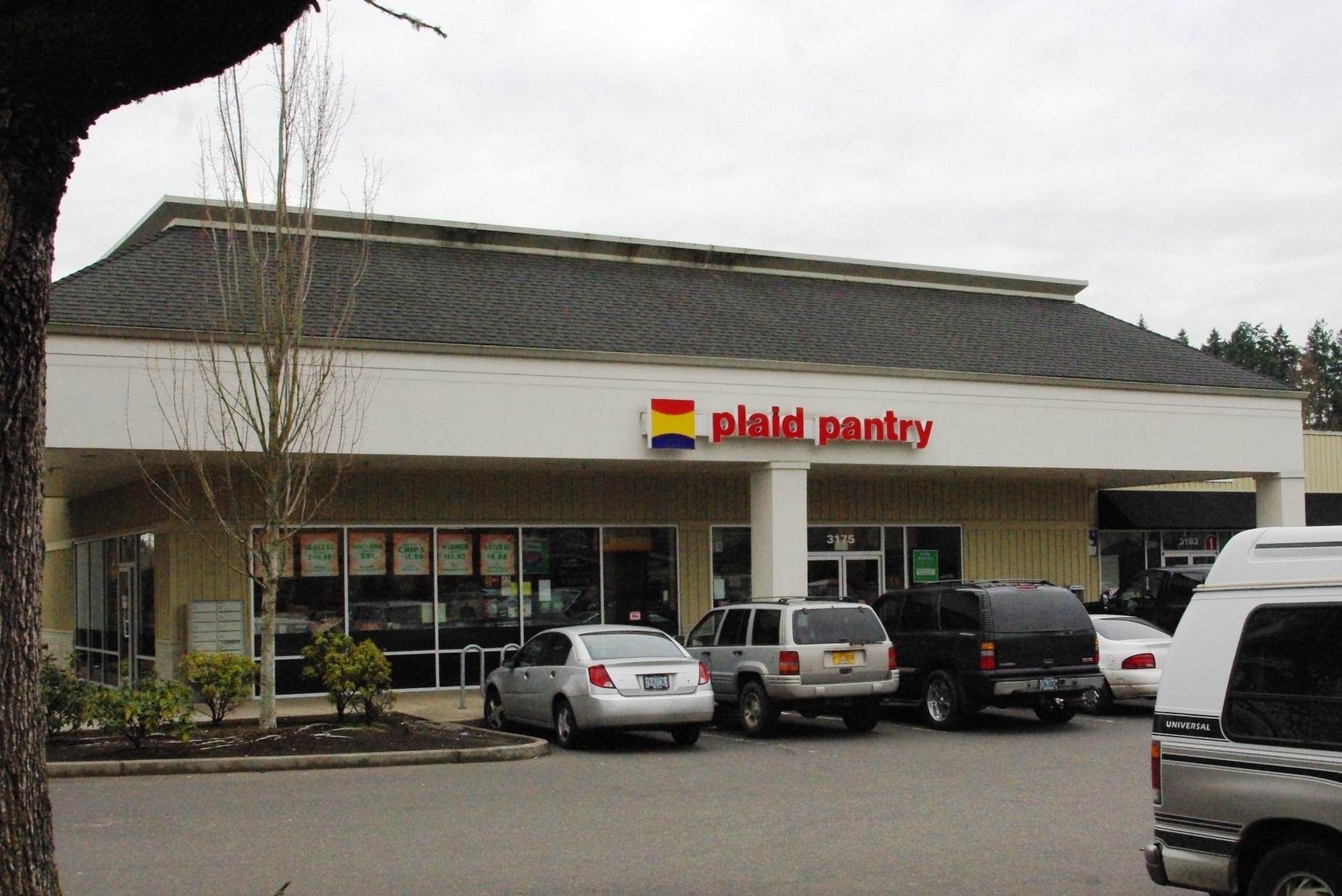
A location in Hillsboro, Oregon

A series of transactions made public in 1998 put half of the chain under the ownership of a holding company majority-owned by Houlihan Lokey Howard & Zukin (HLHZ), with minority ownership stakes held by senior Plaid Pantry management including CEO Chris Girard.

The details of the 1998 deal and several subsequent transactions became the subject of a lawsuit in 2007 before the United States District Court for the District of Oregon between HLHZ and Girard. The lawsuit was settled in 2008.

In May 2019, the company terminated an employee who produced a gun during an attempted robbery involving a suspect with a hatchet at one of its Clackamas County stores. The reason given for termination is for violating the company's no weapon policy.

== Oregon Bottle Bill politics ==
In 1969, as the Oregon Bottle Bill was contemplated as a way to reduce litter, large retailers opposed the idea and said that no one would return bottles and cans for a two-cent deposit. Furthermore, opponents of the bill claimed that small grocery stores would face an extraordinary financial burden from receiving and processing thousands of bottles and cans, potentially bankrupting several stores. John Piacentini disagreed. He offered a half cent for each soda or beer bottle returned to Plaid Pantry stores. Piacentini even stated that he hoped Oregonians "bury me in litter." Piacentini was a traveling advocate of the bottle bill.

The current CEO Jonathan Polonsky said in 2025 "There’s nothing sexy about taking back other people’s bottles and cans" and he commented that Plaid Pantry only continue to accept bottles because they're obligated to do so by law. Polonsky expressed enthusiasm for a proposed change to the Oregon Bottle Bill which allows stores to stop acceptance at 6PM or 8PM.

== Alcohol sales ==
In the late 1990s, Plaid Pantry failed 30-40% of spot checks conducted by the OLCC to determine if the company was selling alcohol or tobacco to minors; by March 2000, they became the first retailer recognized by the OLCC as a "responsible vendor", a milestone reached due to changes to the company's training and its credit card validation system, which were updated to simplify a clerk's ability to ascertain whether a customer was of legal age.
