= Richard O. Eymann =

American politician (1919–2005)

Richard Oswald Eymann
- Eymann circa 1973

53rd Speaker of the Oregon House of Representatives
- In office 1973–1974
- Preceded by: Bob Smith
- Succeeded by: Philip D. Lang

Member of the Oregon House of Representatives
- In office 1961–1964; 1969–1975
- Constituency: Lane County

Personal details
- Born: February 3, 1919 Medicine Hat, Alberta, Canada
- Died: September 26, 2005 (aged 86) Springfield, Oregon, U.S.
- Party: Democratic
- Spouse: Juanita Eymann
- Education: Dartmouth College

Richard Oswald Eymann (February 3, 1919 – September 26, 2005) was an American businessman and politician in the state of Oregon. A native of Alberta, Canada, he served as an airman during World War II and then graduated from Dartmouth College. Eymann moved to Oregon where he would serve as a Democrat in the Oregon House of Representatives, including one session as Speaker.

== Early life ==
Richard O. Eymann was born in 1919 in Medicine Hat, Alberta, Canada. After service in the South Pacific Theater during World War II as an airman, he attended Dartmouth College in New Hampshire. He graduated with a master's degree in business administration in 1947 and moved to Springfield, Oregon.

In Oregon, he worked for Weyerhaeuser as an executive at their mill in Springfield. Eymann married Juanita, and they had eight children; Richard, Ramona, Patricia, Carol, Katy, Deborah, Rebecca and Penelope. Eymann would work for the Oregon State Tax Commission as executive secretary before entering politics. He also helped to found McKenzie-Willamette Memorial Hospital in Springfield and was one of the original administrators at Lane Community College, later moving to the neighboring Mohawk Valley.

== Political career ==
In 1960, Eymann was elected as a Democrat to serve District 14 and Lane County in the Oregon House of Representatives. He won re-election and served in the 1963 legislature, representing District 13 after reapportionment. He was a delegate to the 1968 Democratic National Convention in Chicago.

Eymann returned to the Oregon Legislative Assembly during the 1969 session. He was re-elected in 1970 to the same seat, and was elected again in 1972, but to District 44. During the 1973 session he was elected as Speaker of the House, serving through the 1974 special session of the legislature. He defeated Les AuCoin in the election for the Speakership. During the session he served as Speaker the legislature passed many bills including the Oregon Shield Law, land use planning, and a bill to allow public employees to unionize.

In 1974, Eymann lost his run at re-election to Republican Bill Rogers. In 1986, he attempted to get the Democratic nomination to run against incumbent Bob Packwood for U.S. Senate after the primary winner dropped out, but lost out to Rick Bauman. In 1992, Eymann tried to return to public office, running for Oregon State Treasurer. Eymann won 27% of the vote in the May Democratic primary, losing to Jim Hill who also won in the November general election.

== Later years and family ==
In 1978, he assisted in the establishment of the Emerald People's Utility District, the publicly-owned power company serving the areas surrounding Springfield and Eugene. Eymann served on the board of the organization from founding until 2004. His son Richard C. is an attorney in Spokane, Washington. Daughter Ramona has served as the chief clerk for the Oregon House since 1985, while daughter Katy married Bill Bradbury. Richard O. Eymann died on September 26, 2005, near Springfield at the age of 86.

== See also ==
- 57th Oregon Legislative Assembly
