= Les AuCoin =

American politician (born 1942)

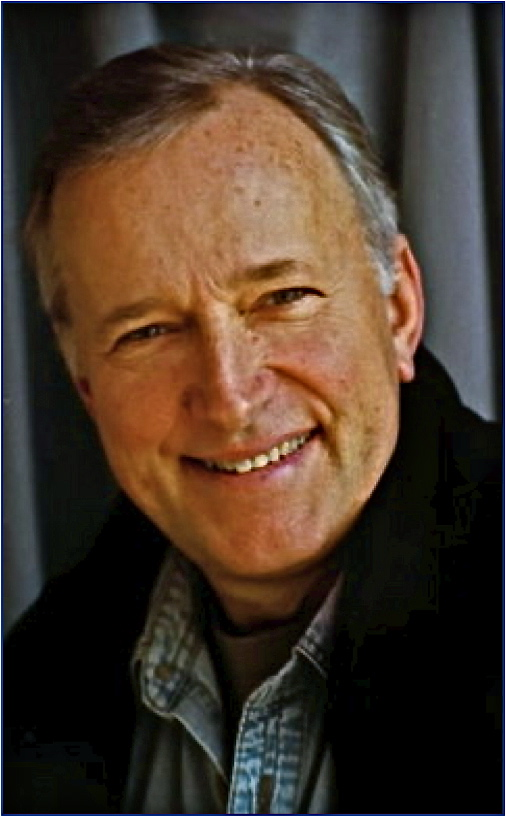

Member of the U.S. House of Representatives from Oregon's 1st district
- In office January 3, 1975 – January 3, 1993
- Preceded by: Wendell Wyatt
- Succeeded by: Elizabeth Furse

Majority Leader of the Oregon House of Representatives
- In office January 1973 – January 1975
- Preceded by: Thomas Young
- Succeeded by: Ed Lindquist

Member of the Oregon House of Representatives from the 4th district
- In office January 1971 – January 1975
- Preceded by: David Frost
- Succeeded by: Bill Ferguson

Personal details
- Born: Walter Leslie AuCoin; October 21, 1942 (age 83) Portland, Oregon, U.S.
- Party: Democratic
- Spouse: Sue Swearingen (m. 1964)
- Children: 2, including Kelly
- Education: Portland State University; Pacific University (BA)

Military service
- Allegiance: United States
- Branch/service: United States Army

Walter Leslie AuCoin (/oʊˈkɔɪn/ oh-KOYN; born October 21, 1942) is an American politician. In 1974 he became the first person from the Democratic Party to be elected to the U.S. House of Representatives from Oregon's 1st congressional district since it was formed in 1892. The seat has been held by Democrats ever since.

AuCoin's 18-year tenure—from the 94th United States Congress through the 102nd—is the sixth-longest in Oregon history. In his career, AuCoin took a prominent role in abortion rights, local and national environmental issues, multiple-use management of federal forests, and national security. During the presidency of Ronald Reagan, he wrote the ban to stop Interior Secretary James Watt's plan to open the Pacific Outer Continental Shelf to oil exploration. AuCoin was an early advocate of diplomatic relations with the People's Republic of China and arms control with the Soviet Union, and a critic of U.S. support for the Nicaraguan Contras and the rightist government of El Salvador in the 1980s. At the time of his retirement in 1993, he was 84th in overall House seniority, dean of the Oregon House delegation, a majority whip-at-large, and a veteran member of the House Appropriations Committee.

AuCoin was a two-term member of the Oregon House of Representatives from 1971 to 1974. In his second term, he was House Majority Leader, at the age of 31. He is a full-time author, writer, lecturer and occasional blogger. AuCoin is a member of the ReFormers Caucus of Issue One. He and his wife Susan live in Portland.

== Early life ==
AuCoin was born in Portland, Oregon, on October 21, 1942, to Francis Edgar AuCoin, a short order cook from Portland, Maine, and Alice Audrey Darrar, a waitress from Madras, Oregon. When he was four, his father abandoned the family. Les and his brother Leland moved with their mother to Redmond, Oregon, then a small Central Oregon sawmill and farming town, living on her restaurant wages and tips. AuCoin attended Redmond High School, where he was elected most valuable player on the school's basketball team. He also joined the staff of the school newspaper, where he discovered an aptitude for writing—a skill that would help propel him into journalism, Congress and, in political retirement, life as a writer. In 1960, he became the first male in his extended family to graduate from high school.

AuCoin enrolled at Pacific University in Forest Grove, Oregon, then transferred to Portland State University. In 1961, he enlisted in the United States Army. He was assigned to the 2nd Infantry Division and the 10th Mountain Division where he served as a public information specialist, writing dispatches to The Nashville Banner, the Louisville Courier-Journal, The Nashville Tennessean, Stars and Stripes, and Army Times, among other publications. AuCoin's Army postings included Fort Ord, California; Fort Slocum, New York; Fort Campbell, Kentucky; Fort Benning, Georgia; and Sullivan Barracks, West Germany. While stationed in the segregated South, AuCoin was caught up in a near race riot in reaction to a sit-in by blacks at an all-white lunch counter, an event that crystallized his zeal for progressive politics.

Following his Army career, AuCoin worked for one summer at The Redmond Spokesman newspaper, then returned to Pacific University, where he was hired as the director of the school's public information department and simultaneously completed his Bachelor of Arts degree in journalism in 1969. He married Susan Swearingen in 1964, and the couple had two children: Stacy in 1965 and Kelly in 1967.

== Oregon House of Representatives ==
In 1968, AuCoin's opposition to the Vietnam War led him to co-chair Eugene McCarthy's Presidential campaign in Oregon's Washington County, west of Portland. AuCoin stayed with McCarthy after President Lyndon B. Johnson dropped out of the race. McCarthy's upset victory over Robert F. Kennedy in the Oregon Democratic primary encouraged AuCoin to run for elective office in 1970, seeking and winning an open seat in the Oregon House of Representatives in Washington County. Two years later, he was re-elected to the 57th Oregon Legislative Assembly. The Democrats took control of the chamber and he was elected House Majority Leader, the second highest position in the House.

During his time in the Oregon House, AuCoin championed environmental, consumer protection, and civil rights issues. As the Democratic floor leader, he helped pass maverick Republican Governor Tom McCall's plan (opposed by legislative Republicans and later rejected by voters) to provide 95% state funding for public schools, enacted statewide land use planning rules, reduced penalties for possession of small amounts of marijuana, and established funding of mass transit from highway funds that had been earmarked solely for roads. AuCoin also chaired the committee that led the efforts to ratify the Equal Rights Amendment.

== U.S. Congress ==
In 1974, United States congressman Wendell Wyatt of Oregon's 1st congressional district announced that he would not seek a sixth term. AuCoin won a five-way Democratic primary with more than 50% of the vote and then faced Republican state public utility commissioner Diarmuid O'Scannlain in the general election. With the Watergate scandal fresh in the minds of voters, AuCoin became the first Democrat ever elected to the 1st district, winning 56% of the vote to O'Scannlain's 44%. He was subsequently re-elected eight times despite being initially targeted by the national Republican Party as "an easy mark." After AuCoin's departure, the Republican Party continued to regard the district as one they could expect to win, though the Democratic Party has held the seat ever since.

=== Defense ===
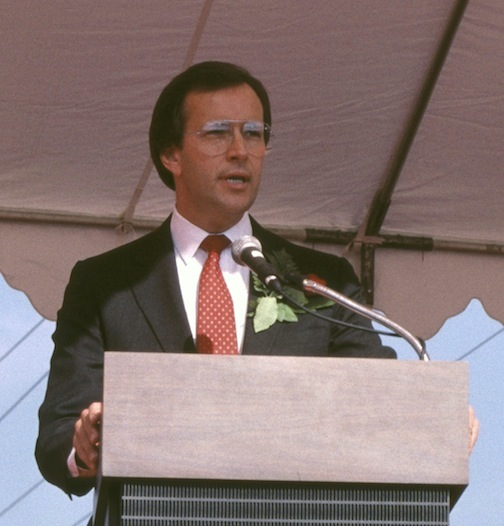
Congressman AuCoin in 1986

In 1981, AuCoin won a seat on the House Appropriations Committee, and two years later, was appointed to the subcommittee on Defense appropriations. AuCoin became a legislative critic of weaponizing space, opposing the Strategic Defense Initiative, basing his opposition on probability theory, holding that it could not fully defend the United States in the event of an attack. He also authored a legislative ban on U.S. flight tests of anti-satellite weapons, which carried the force of law unless the president certified that the Soviet Union tested a similar weapon of its own. His amendment effectively legislated arms control for the first time through an act of Congress.

AuCoin supported the nuclear freeze movement and was a leading critic of President Reagan's proposed MX missile, arguing that such "first strike" weapons would prompt the Soviet Union to match them, and, since a first strike ability favored the aggressor, reasoning that such an event would increase the vulnerability of the U.S.

Although he opposed the Reagan administration on strategic weapons, AuCoin used his position on the defense subcommittee to improve U.S. conventional arms. On an inspection tour at Fort Benning, he learned from the commander of the United States Army Infantry School that replacement of the aging M47 Dragon anti-tank missile was a major infantry priority because it exposed its operator to enemy return fire until his round found its target. AuCoin, himself a former infantryman, pressed for the development of a modern substitute, often resisting the U.S. Army Missile Command and other agencies that favored other technologies. AuCoin's legislation resulted in the adoption of the FGM-148 Javelin missile, which put its homing device in the round rather than the launcher to allow its operator to fire and immediately seek cover. The Javelin was first used in the 2003 Iraq War and is considered by some military scholars to be "revolutionary" in its potential to put infantry on a more equal footing against armor in conventional land warfare.

=== Foreign policy ===
AuCoin's opposition to U.S. support of authoritarian governments in El Salvador and Guatemala and the Nicaraguan Contras—irregular forces armed by the Reagan administration to topple the Sandinista government—led him to travel frequently to Central America to document right wing human rights abuses. In 1987, a constituent of AuCoin's named Ben Linder was killed by Contra forces while helping build a small hydroelectric electricity generator for Nicaraguan villagers. Pressed by AuCoin to investigate, the U.S. State Department noted discrepant accounts of Linder's death: the Contras asserted that Linder died in a firefight, but village witnesses claimed the Contras gave no opportunity to surrender and assassinated Linder at point-blank range.

In his second congressional term, AuCoin's 1978 amendment to grant partial most favored nation trade status to the People's Republic of China was the first China trade bill to reach the House floor. Though narrowly defeated, it presaged the United States' formal normalization of political and trade relations with China less than a year later. In February 1979, AuCoin led a trade mission of Oregon business leaders to China, the first such delegation from any U.S. state.

=== Oregon economy ===
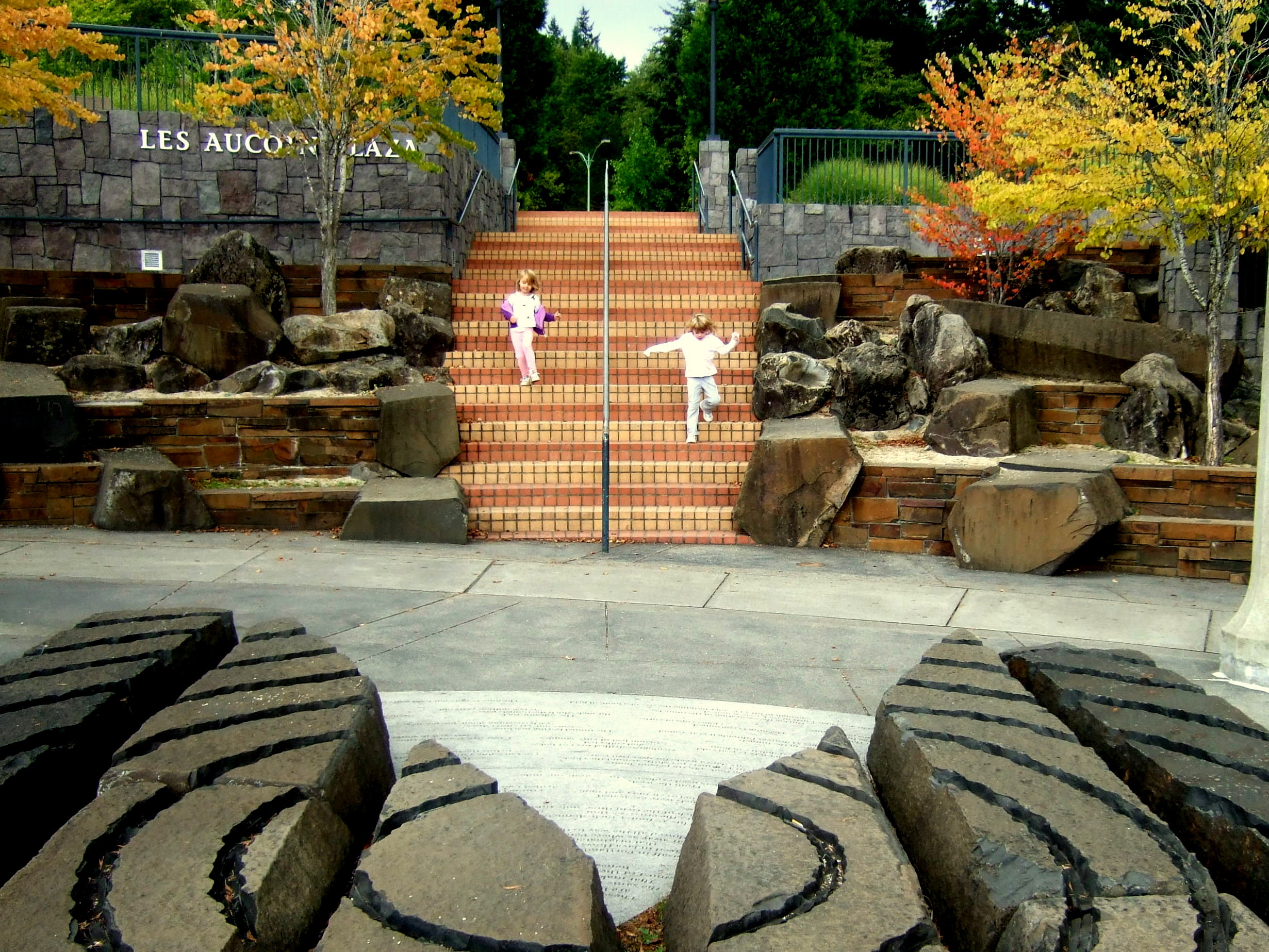
The Les AuCoin Plaza at the Washington Park MAX station

AuCoin used his seat on the House Interior Appropriations Subcommittee to address a number of economic priorities throughout Oregon, including construction of the Oregon Trail Center in economically distressed Baker City, renovation of Crater Lake Lodge, restoration of the Confederated Tribes of the Grande Ronde and Confederated Tribes of Siletz, and construction of the Seafood Consumer Research Center in Astoria and the Fort Clatsop Memorial Visitors Center.

Working together, AuCoin and Oregon Senator Mark Hatfield secured federal funding for the construction of Portland's acclaimed east- and west-side light rail projects, the largest public works project in Oregon history. Since its unveiling, the rail system has guided urban growth and spawned an estimated $3.5 billion in new construction in the Portland metropolitan area. For his work on the project, a plaza at one of the stations is dedicated to him.

AuCoin had a hand in the rescue of Northwest lumber and plywood mills during the recession of the early 1980s. The mills faced financial ruin when federal timber sales contracts they had purchased at a face value of hundreds of millions of dollars were rendered worthless by the collapse of the lumber and plywood markets. Along with Senators Hatfield and Howard Metzenbaum, AuCoin helped write the Federal Timber Contract Payment Modification Act of 1984. After requiring timber companies to pay a penalty to the U.S. Treasury, the bill released the firms from their contracts and allowed them to return approximately 9.5 billion board feet (22,000,000 m^{3}) of standing timber to the government, much of it commercially pre-thinned.

=== Environment ===
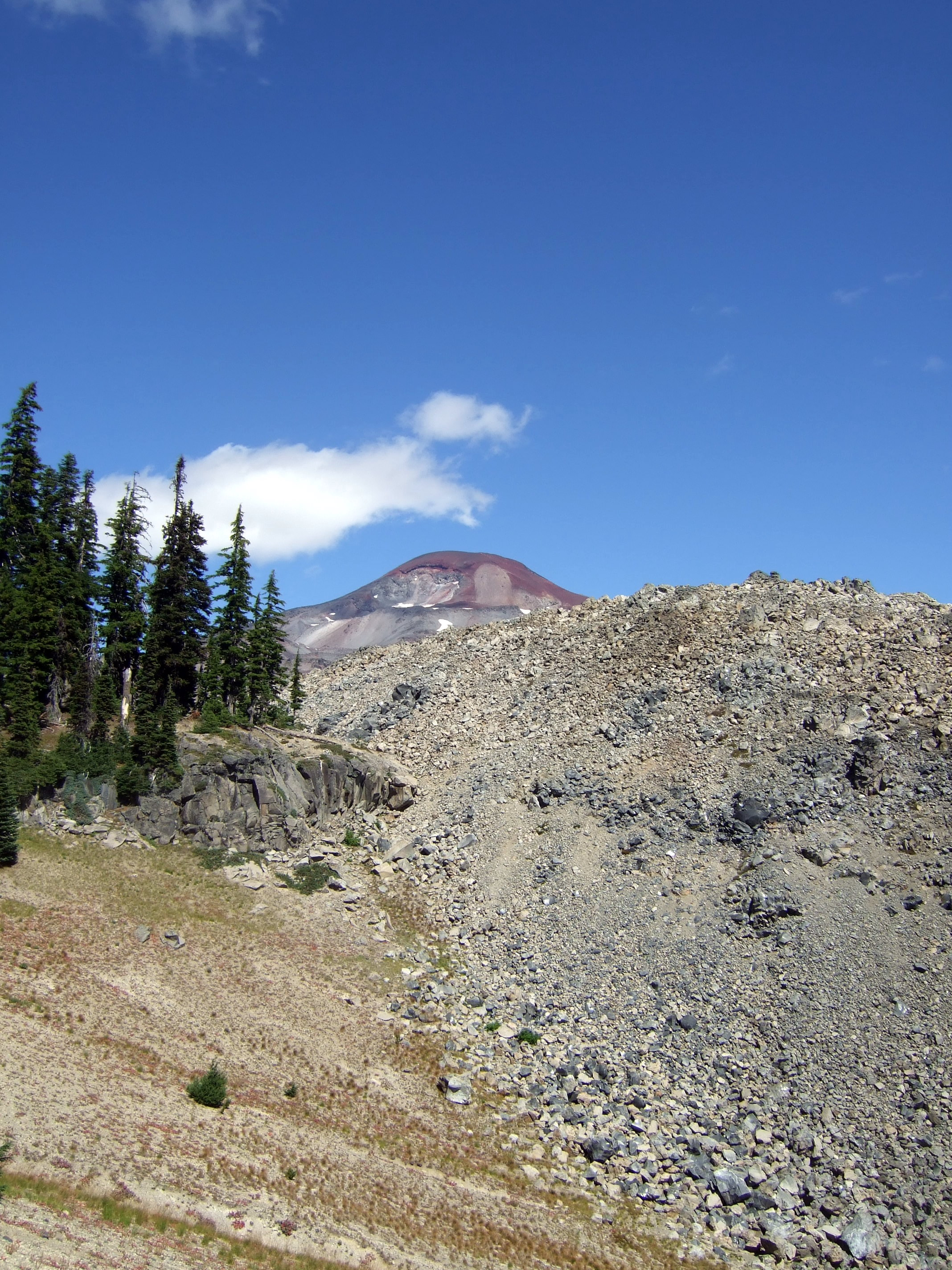
Rock Mesa in the Three Sisters Wilderness

AuCoin's environmental record earned him the endorsement of major environmental organizations in each of his House elections. In addition to blocking offshore oil exploration, AuCoin prevented mining in the center of Oregon's Three Sisters Wilderness area by buying out a mining claim in the area's geologically significant Rock Mesa and served on the committee that helped write the 200-mile offshore economic zone, which would become known as the Magnuson Act. Although the Port of Portland shipyards, a major Oregon employer, stood to benefit from oil drilling in the Arctic National Wildlife Refuge, AuCoin opposed the plan on environmental grounds. He also helped preserve Cascade Head on the Oregon Coast, supported the Columbia Gorge Scenic Protection Act, helped stop the construction of Salt Caves Dam on the last free-flowing stretch of the Klamath River, co-authored the 1988 bill quadrupling the designation of National Wild and Scenic Rivers in Oregon, and fought the construction of a plant at the Umatilla Chemical Depot to incinerate excess chemical weapons.

His work on the 1984 Oregon Wilderness Act, which doubled wilderness acreage in Oregon's federal forests, earned him a Distinguished Service award from the Sierra Club.

==== Timber harvest controversies ====
Soon after the decades-long effort to expand wilderness was resolved, annual timber harvests on Forest Service lands in Oregon and Washington had increased to reach a crisis point in the late 1980s. Critics charged that AuCoin, along with other Northwest members of Congress, were forcing unsustainable logging levels, noting Congress's proposed annual timber harvests of more than 4 billion board feet per year—well above historical averages of 2.6 to 3 billion board feet (bbf) for the region.

However, Randal O'Toole, a self-described libertarian and environmental economist, observed that the harvest numbers cited by critics included timber that had been sold, often commercially pre-thinned, returned to the government through the Timber Contract Relief Act, and therefore were inaccurately inflated. Excluding the "buy-back" volume net harvests of new "green" timber were lower than average: 2.6 billion board feet (bbf) in 1986 and 1987, 2.3 bbf in 1988, and 1.9 bbf in 1989.

AuCoin was also criticized for working with Senator Hatfield, Washington Representative Norman D. Dicks, and House Speaker Tom Foley for legislating a special timber sales program in 1990. The legislation, referred to disparagingly by some environmentalists as "The Rider from Hell," was in response to an injunction by federal judge William Lee Dwyer that shut down all logging in federal forests in the Pacific Northwest after the Forest Service and Bureau of Land Management failed to develop management plans for the threatened northern spotted owl. Responding to the imminent collapse of jobs in timber and related industries, the amendment legislated a harvest, but also gave old-growth forests statutory status for the first time, directed that fragmentation of them be minimized, and banned logging of them in designated spotted owl habitat areas identified in the environmental impact statement., effectively overruling Judge Dwyer's order. While AuCoin and the other sponsors stated an intention for the law to be temporary while plans to protect forests and threatened species such as the spotted owl were put in place, it authorized a two-year harvest of more than 5 billion board feet in Oregon and Washington and became a precedent for future industry-supported environmental waivers long after AuCoin left Congress. In his last years in Congress, AuCoin worked to lower the regional harvest to 1.1 bbf in 1991, 0.8 bbf in 1992, and 0.6 bbf in 1993.

=== Abortion ===
AuCoin was one of the House's key leaders for abortion choice, helping to defeat the Hyde Amendment, which barred public funds for abortion services for pregnant Medicaid recipients as well as in U.S. military hospitals abroad. The amendment was dropped in the Senate when President George H. W. Bush threatened to veto the entire defense appropriation measure if it remained in.

=== Gun control ===
His opposition to gun control legislation angered many of his urban constituents while pleasing numerous rural voters. AuCoin switched his position during his legislative career, emphasized with an essay in The Washington Post, supporting what would become the Brady Handgun Violence Prevention Act which passed after he left office in 1993. At the time of his action, no other member of the Oregon delegation supported tighter gun control laws.

== 1992 race for the U.S. Senate ==
In 1992, AuCoin ran for the United States Senate against Republican incumbent Bob Packwood, giving up his seat in the House of Representatives. Both the Democratic primary and the general election were strongly contested, and involved several controversies.

As the election season got underway, analysts from both major parties predicted that Packwood would have one of the toughest seats to defend in what was anticipated to be a volatile election year. Packwood was regarded as one of the nation's "most powerful elected officials" with "extraordinary political instincts." But the state's largest newspaper, The Oregonian, had described AuCoin (Packwood's presumed main challenger) as having "persistence, imagination and clout [that] have made him the most powerful congressman in Oregon and one of the most influential members from the Northwest."

For AuCoin, however, first came the Democratic primary. He faced Portland attorney Joe Wetzel and Bend businessman Harry Lonsdale in what became a "brutal, bitter" contest. Lonsdale, who had run a close race against incumbent Mark Hatfield for Oregon's other Senate seat two years prior, emerged as AuCoin's principal rival; Wetzel, who criticized Packwood and AuCoin as long-term, ineffective members of Congress, trailed throughout the race, and was not invited to an April debate sponsored by the City Club of Portland. Lonsdale took on "the Les AuCoin-Mark Hatfield-Bob Packwood coalition" as his primary cause, stating "I consider Les AuCoin a good man who has been corrupted by PAC money over the years".

In a race the Seattle Times called "as negative as many voters can remember," Lonsdale attacked AuCoin as "corrupt" and tied to the timber industry. Lonsdale's environmental credentials also came under scrutiny, and AuCoin noted Lonsdale's reversal of support for nuclear power and belated opposition to the re-opening of Trojan Nuclear Power Plant. AuCoin turned accusations of undue influence back on Lonsdale, pointing out that his company (Bend Research) had received millions in federal defense contracts.

On the Republican side, Packwood had gone through a divorce in 1991, and his ex-wife threatened to run against him amid mounting concerns about his "eye for the ladies." The socially conservative Oregon Citizens Alliance (OCA) was at the apex of its statewide prominence with 1992's anti-gay Measure 9 and its newly formed American Heritage Party (AHP). The group endorsed Republican challenger Joe Lutz, who had run against Packwood in the past on a family values platform; but Lutz soon withdrew, announcing a divorce of his own. As early as January, the OCA considered backing former gubernatorial candidate Al Mobley as an independent or as a member of the AHP. Mobley decided in mid-August not to run, stating that he could not bear the idea that he might be responsible for causing AuCoin to be elected.

Even during the primary, Packwood and AuCoin traded barbs on various issues. Packwood joined Lonsdale in criticizing AuCoin for his involvement in what was reported as a rash of check-bouncing among members of Congress; AuCoin characterized the issue as a series of mistakes, rather than gross abuses. In what was believed to be an unprecedented move, Packwood attempted to influence the Democratic primary's outcome by running television ads against AuCoin.

The results of the Democratic primary were so close that an automatic recount was triggered. AuCoin held a news conference on May 23 in the South Park Blocks stating he would wait for the recount, but the margin was currently 248 votes in his favor. On June 18, over a month after the primary election, AuCoin was certified as having won by 330 votes. Upon conceding the race, Lonsdale pondered mounting a write-in campaign, reiterating that Oregon needed an "outsider" in the Senate.

By the end of June, when the recount was complete, AuCoin was nearly out of campaign funds; Packwood entered the general election race with $3.2 million and was ranked sixth nationwide among senators raising funds outside their home state during the 1990–1992 election season.

AuCoin opposed weakening the Endangered Species Act (ESA) to erase the northern spotted owl's impact on the timber industry, but Packwood ("one of the timber industry's chief allies," according to Oregon State University political scientist William Lunch) assailed "environmental extremists" and introduced legislation to convene a presidential cabinet committee to exempt the endangered owl from the ESA.

In September, Packwood pulled ads that had falsely criticized AuCoin for missing votes while speaking to special interest groups. By October, Packwood had raised $8 million, spending $5.4 million more than AuCoin, and leading all Senate incumbents. Yet that fall, the two candidates were in a dead heat, with Packwood continuing to criticize AuCoin on attendance, his House bank account and the spotted owl, and AuCoin echoing the campaign of popular presidential candidate Bill Clinton by accusing Packwood of favoring the wealthy over the middle class.

The outcome of the bruising race was too close to call on election night, but on the following day, Packwood emerged as the winner with about 52% of the vote to AuCoin's 48%. In his victory press conference, Packwood endorsed AuCoin for Secretary of the Interior in the Clinton administration. When told of Packwood's comments, AuCoin responded by saying "I think that's real special."

Magnifying the controversy of the race was a decision by the Washington Post to delay until after the election coverage of its year-long investigation into detailed claims of sexual abuse and assault made by 10 women against Packwood. The paper published the story two months after election day. Oregon's largest daily newspaper, The Oregonian, did not break the story either, despite its own investigation and its congressional correspondent being subjected to Packwood's advances. This led to a joke, "If it matters to Oregonians, it's in the Washington Post (a twist on the Oregonian's slogan, "If it matters to Oregonians, it's in the Oregonian.") The paper's editor would later admit to having been less than aggressive in pursuing the story due to concerns about "...ruining a man's career."

A group of Oregon voters battled Packwood lawyers in briefs before the Senate Rules Committee in an unsuccessful attempt to persuade the panel to refuse to seat the senator on the grounds of election fraud for lying about the abuses. The senator admitted to the acts in 1994 and was forced to resign after the Senate Ethics Committee censured him for his conduct in 1995.

AuCoin was considered for Secretary of the Interior and Secretary of the Army in the new Clinton administration, though he was not offered either post. When news of Packwood's resignation broke, AuCoin stated that he would not come out of retirement to run for the seat. He also stated that he would not engage in professional lobbying, but was criticized the next year for becoming the chairman of the government relations practice group in the law firm Bogle & Gates.

A decade later, Governor Ted Kulongoski nominated AuCoin for the Oregon Board of Forestry, reportedly to balance out the perceived dominance of the timber industry on that board. But the industry mounted an extensive lobbying campaign against the former congressman, accusing him of environmental extremism, and his appointment was derailed in the Oregon State Senate.

== Life after political office ==
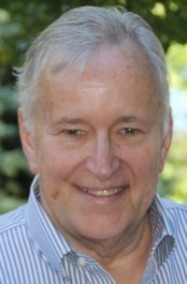
AuCoin in 2014

AuCoin went into higher education five years after leaving the Congress, joining the faculty at Southern Oregon University in Ashland as a visiting professor of political science and business ethics. He was named Outstanding Professor of the Year by the SOU chapter of Phi Kappa Phi, the nation's largest scholarly society. AuCoin was also voted by SOU students as one of the university's four "most popular professors." While at SOU, he won an Oregon Associated Press award for political commentary at Jefferson Public Radio. AuCoin writes on national issues for the Huffington Post, freelances magazine articles, and publishes book reviews for regional newspapers. He is co-author of The Wildfire Reader: A Century of Failed Forest Policy. In the 1960s, while working at Pacific University, he won several national awards for excellence in editing the school's official magazine.

AuCoin and his wife Sue campaigned in Wisconsin in 2004 for Democratic presidential nominee John Kerry for the last month of his presidential race. In 2008, they drove to Ohio to spend the last five weeks of the election cycle campaigning for Democratic nominee Barack Obama.

The former congressman lectures at and serves on the advisory board to the Maxwell School's National Security Studies program at Syracuse University in New York. In 2009, Defense Secretary Robert Gates appointed him to the Transformation Advisory Group of the Pentagon's U.S. Joint Forces Command. AuCoin is a corporate director at the Federal Home Loan Bank of Seattle and Teton Heritage Builders, Inc., a high-end residential housing contractor located in Jackson, Wyoming, and Bozeman, Montana. He has been an expert witness in federal district court on issues regarding fiduciary duties of corporate board directors, and he served as vice chair of the board of trustees of Pacific University. In 2014, Oregon governor John Kitzhaber named AuCoin to the inaugural board of trustees of Southern Oregon University. He is a member of the ReFormers Caucus of Issue One.

In 2019, AuCoin wrote a political memoir, Catch and Release: An Oregon Life in Politics, published by Oregon State University Press.

U.S. House of Representatives
Preceded by Wendell Wyatt	Member of the U.S. House of Representatives from Oregon's 1st congressional district 1975–1993	Succeeded by Elizabeth Furse
Party political offices
Preceded by Robert Byrd, Alan Cranston, Al Gore, Gary Hart, Bennett Johnston, Ted Kennedy, Tip O'Neill, Don Riegle, Paul Sarbanes, Jim Sasser	Response to the State of the Union address 1983; Served alongside: Joe Biden, Bill Bradley, Robert Byrd, Tom Daschle, Bill Hefner, Barbara Kennelly, George Miller, Tip O'Neill, Paul Simon, Paul Tsongas, Tim Wirth	Succeeded by Max Baucus, Joe Biden, David Boren, Barbara Boxer, Robert Byrd, Dante Fascell, Bill Gray, Tom Harkin, Dee Huddleston, Carl Levin, Tip O'Neill, Claiborne Pell
Preceded by Rick Bauman	Democratic nominee for U.S. Senator from Oregon (Class 3); 1992	Succeeded by Ron Wyden
U.S. order of precedence (ceremonial)
Preceded by Lois Capps as Former U.S. Representative	Order of precedence of the United States as Former U.S. Representative	Succeeded by Doug Lamborn as Former U.S. Representative
