= Nancie Fadeley =

American politician (1930–2024)

Member of the Oregon House of Representatives from the 13th, later 42nd district
- In office 1971–1981
- Preceded by: Elizabeth Browne
- Succeeded by: Vern Meyer

Personal details
- Born: Nancie Newell Peacocke; July 11, 1930 St. Louis, Missouri, U.S.
- Died: April 7, 2024 (aged 93)
- Party: Democratic
- Spouse: Edward Fadeley (1953–1984)
- Children: 2
- Occupation: Freelance journalist

Nancie Peacocke Fadeley (July 11, 1930 – April 7, 2024) was a member of the Oregon House of Representatives, representing portions of Springfield and Eugene, in Lane County, Oregon, United States, from 1971 to January 1981. Elected in November 1970, she first took office in January 1971, holding one of five seats (Position 1) in House District 13 (mostly in Lane County). With the implementation in 1972 of a reapportionment plan that replaced all existing Oregon House districts with new single-member districts, Fadeley represented new District 42 starting with the 1973 legislative session.

In 1971 and 1973, she chaired the House Environment and Land Use Committee. During her tenure as the chair, the committee oversaw the passage of Senate Bill 100, Oregon's pioneering, statewide land-use planning legislation, as well as the Oregon Bottle Bill. The passage of SB 100 prompted the formation of 1000 Friends of Oregon, a watchdog organization committed to the defense of, and advocacy for, the state's land-use program.

Later she became a charter member and a national board member of the Older Women's League (OWL), a grassroots organization that advocates for women as they age. After her service in the Oregon Legislative Assembly, Fadeley began a career at the University of Oregon, where she was assistant vice provost.

Fadeley was born in St. Louis, Missouri. She was married to Edward Fadeley for about 30 years, ending in 1984. During the 1970s, the couple both served in the Oregon Legislature — Nancie in the House and Ed in the Senate.

The mother of two children, Fadeley was a freelance journalist who wrote about Oregon history, environmental issues, and concerns of older women. She received a master's degree from the University of Oregon in 1974.
