= Oregon Bottle Bill =

1972 Container-deposit legislation in Oregon

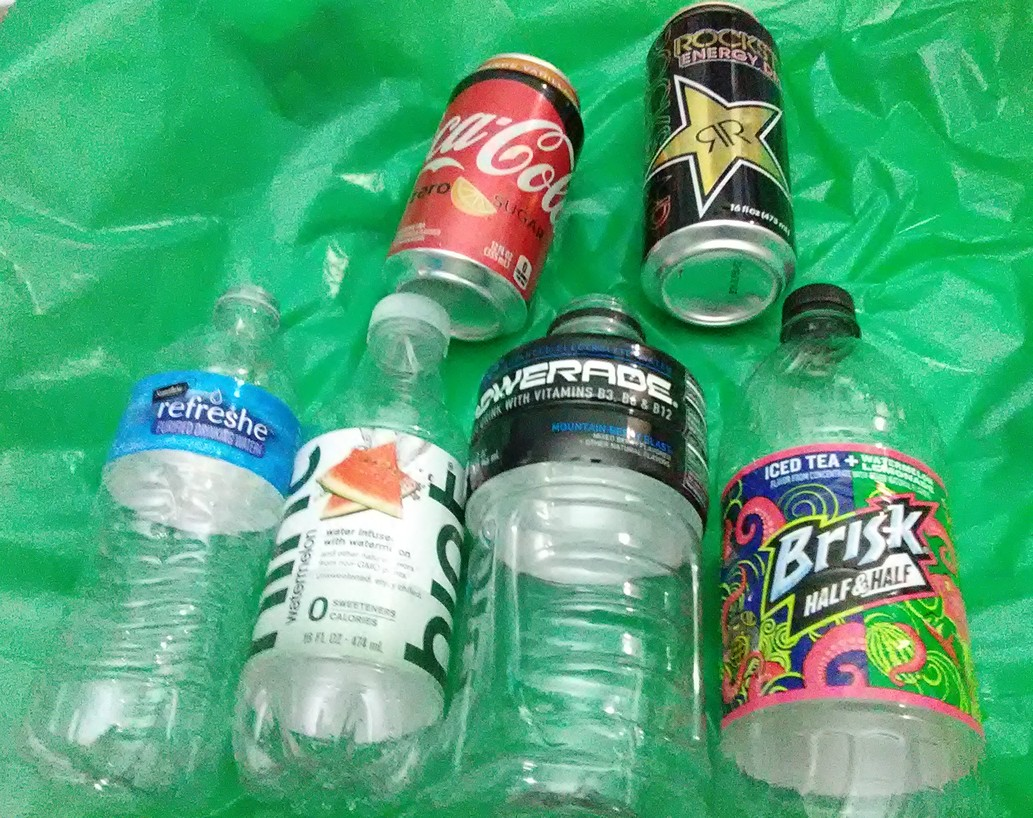
- Examples of containers subject to refund value

Oregon
- Long title: Beverage Container Act
- Enacted by: 56th Oregon Legislative Assembly
- Enacted: 1971
- Commenced: October 1, 1972; 54 years ago

Legislative history
- Bill title: House Bill 1036

Amended by
- 2007 and 2011

Summary
- Required refund value on beverage containers
- Status: In force

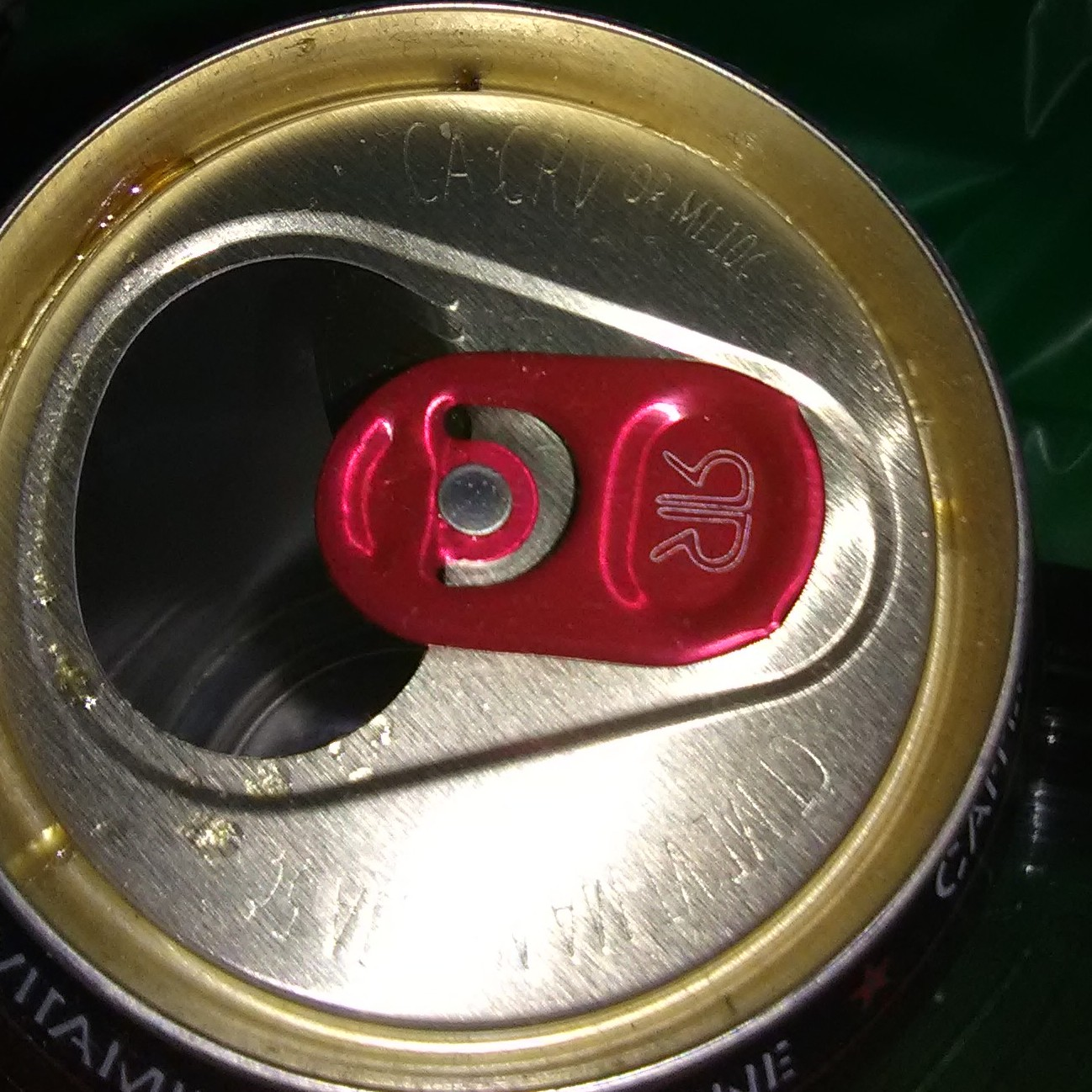
Marking stamped on top of cans indicating OR 10₵

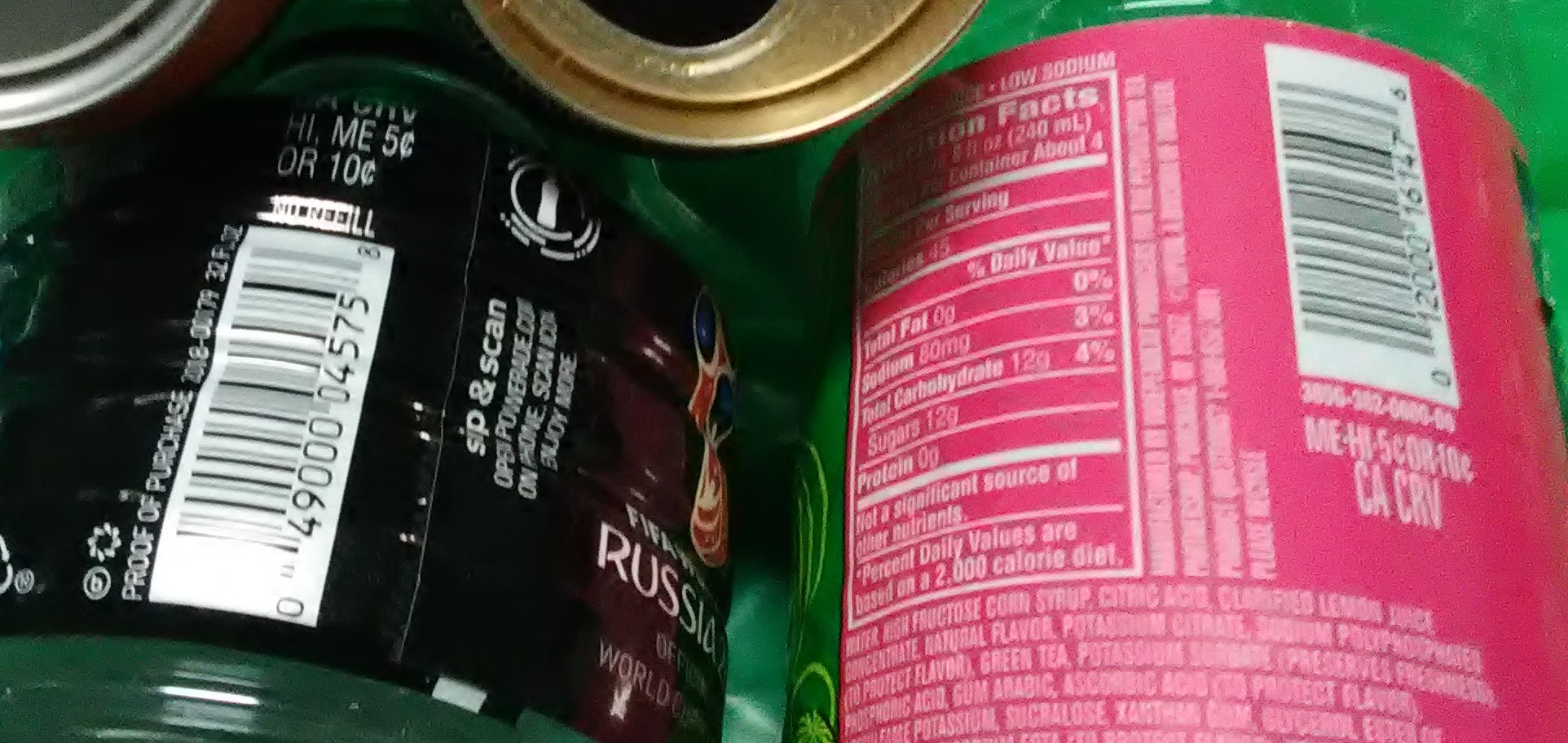
refund value marking on bottles.

The Oregon Bottle Bill is a container-deposit legislation enacted in the U.S. state of Oregon in 1971 that went into effect in October 1972. It was the first such legislation in the United States. It was amended in 2007 and 2011. It requires applicable beverages in applicable sizes in glass, plastic, or metal cans or bottles sold in Oregon to be returnable with a minimum refund value. The refund value was initially 5 cents until April 1, 2017, when it increased to 10 cents. The Oregon Legislature has given the Oregon Liquor Control Commission the authority to administer and enforce the Bottle Bill. Oregon Beverage Recycling Cooperative (OBRC), a private cooperative owned by retailers and beverage distributors, administers the collection and transportation of returned containers and keeps all the unclaimed deposits. Materials from returned containers are sold by the OBRC, and proceeds are handed out to beverage distributors. In 2022, the bottle bill was expanded to include canned wine, which became redeemable on July 1, 2025.

When passed in 1971, the bottle bill was viewed primarily as a litter control measure. In 1971, bottles made up about 40% of litter, 10.8% in 1973, and 6% in 1979. Oregon DEQ reports that the reduction is "as a result of the law" referring to the Bottle Bill. In a 2006 publication it was reported that states without similar bills recycle on average 33% of their containers. A 2016 study by Campbell, Benjamin, et al. found bottle deposit law only had a small impact of about 3% for clear glass and aluminum recycling rate when bottle deposit law coexists with municipal recycling programs. The redemption rate in the 1980s was around 90%. Negative return experiences such as discomfort and inability to return due to retailers failing to keep machines in working order have led to the decline in redemption rate to about 65% by 2015. In 2015, more than 80% of Oregonians lived where curbside recycling is provided. In the same year, the Oregonian's editorial board posited that the bottle deposit has become more redundant as curbside recycling became more common. State law requires retailers and redemption centers to pay the refund value to consumers presenting containers covered under the bottle bill. Beverage distributors charge the initial deposit on shipments of beverages to retailers, who in turn pass it onto customers; however, charging the deposit to consumers is not required by state law. Despite the requirement by state law on beverage retailers to accept bottle returns, unlawful refusal by retailers is common. Beverage distributors retain all deposits not reclaimed by consumers. The 2022 statewide redemption rate for containers subject to deposit was 85.5%.

Starting in the early 2010s, OLCC approved redemption centers run by distributors; there were 16 of them by April 2017. Several redemption centers have seen issues revolving around transients, crime, and drug activities. Community objections to redemption center proposals have revolved around these issues.

Portland, Multnomah County, and state officials have said drug addicts use bottle returns to fund their fentanyl purchase. New temporary rules went into effect on June 4, 2025, which allow retailers to limit returns to 8 a.m. to 8 p.m.; and allow retailers within the City of Portland that accept "green bag" drop-offs to cease accepting loose containers for immediate redemption.

== Covered beverages ==
The refund value has been 10 cents since April 1, 2017, and it applies to covered beverages in cans or bottles made from metal, glass, or plastic.

=== 3 liters or less ===
1. Water and flavored water
2. Beer or other malt beverages
3. carbonated soft drinks.
4. kombucha
5. hard seltzer

=== 4 oz to 1.5 liters ===
Any beverages other than the above in sizes 4 oz to 1.5 liters in metal, glass, or plastic containers are subject to a 10-cent refund value. Some milk-based products such as kefir, drinkable yogurt, milk-based smoothies, and milk or plant-based milk with other ingredients that have been previously excluded were enrolled in the Oregon Bottle Bill in January 2020, but the OLCC reversed the decision on February 5, 2020.

==== exclusions to the refund value requirements ====
Sources:

1. distilled spirits (liquor). Canned cocktails are considered liquor.
2. wine, including mead and hard cider over 8.5% ABV packaged in containers other than metal cans.
3. milk and plant-based milk
4. infant formula
5. vinegar (except drinking vinegar)
6. flavoring and condiments, including juices not normally drunk without mixing, like lemon and lime juice
7. concentrates and syrup
8. meal replacements

=== Senate Bill 1520 (canned wine) ===
2022 expansion to Oregon Bottle Bill made wine in metal cans redeemable and went info effect on July 1, 2025.

== Deposit redemption ==
=== Bag drop-off redemption ===
Bulk bottle redemption by bag drop was introduced in 2010. In this redemption method, consumers create an account and fill designated bags with empty containers and drop off the filled bags to a participating location. They're collected and taken to a processing center, and the refund value is credited to the consumer's account after they have been counted. By February 2024, one in four households in Oregon had a bag account. In October 2023, OBRC restricted bag redemption service to Oregon residents only and banned out-of-state account holders. State audit reported that consumers have complained about accuracy of the counting process, but found the program generally works well. The audit identified an instance where the OBRC incorrectly counted against a usage quota and commented that they were unable to identify where the discrepancy came from because the account only shows the current balance without revealing credit for each bag.

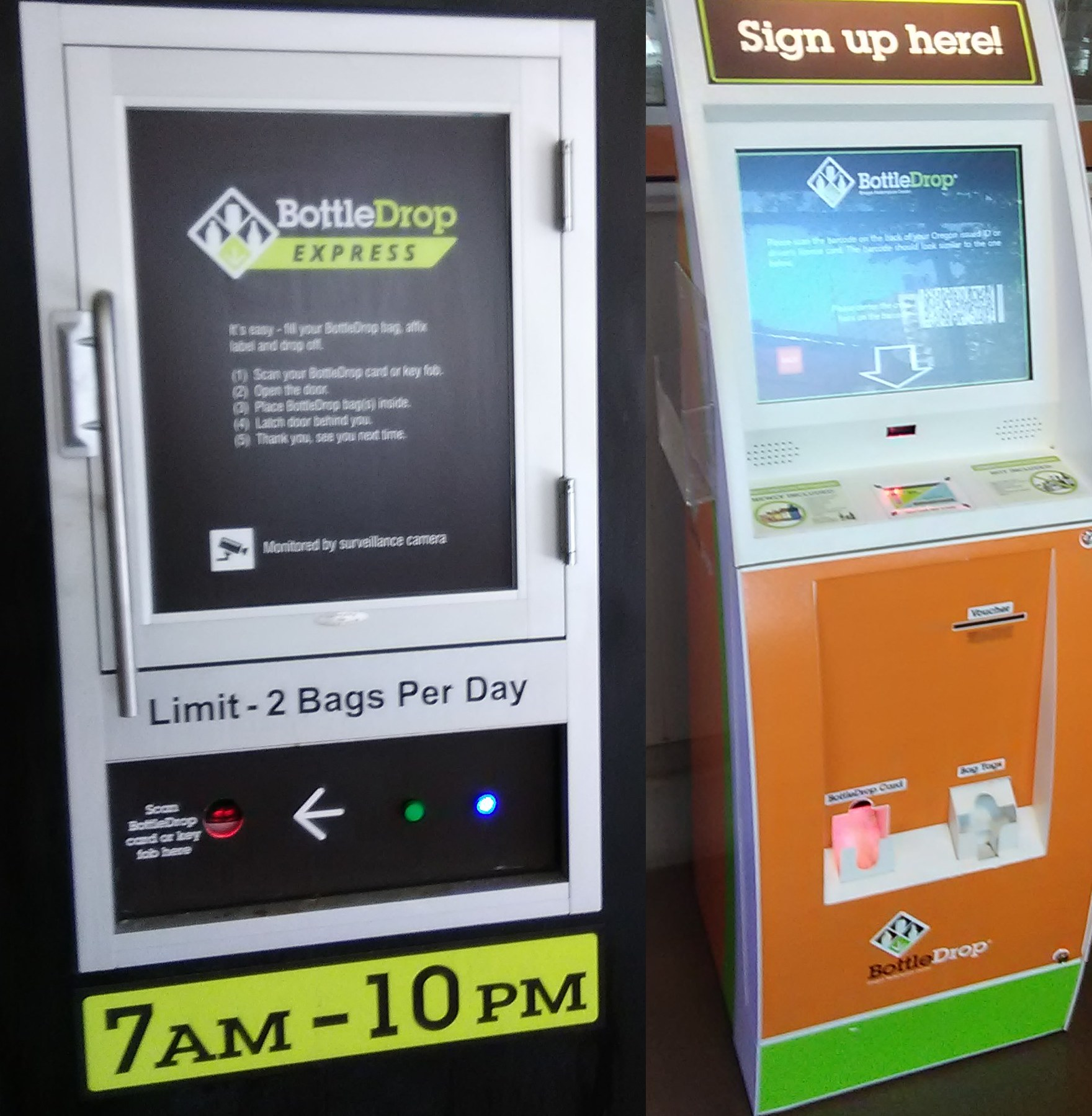
BottleDrop Express drop vault for depositing tagged green bags and a BottleDrop kiosk for account access and label printing.

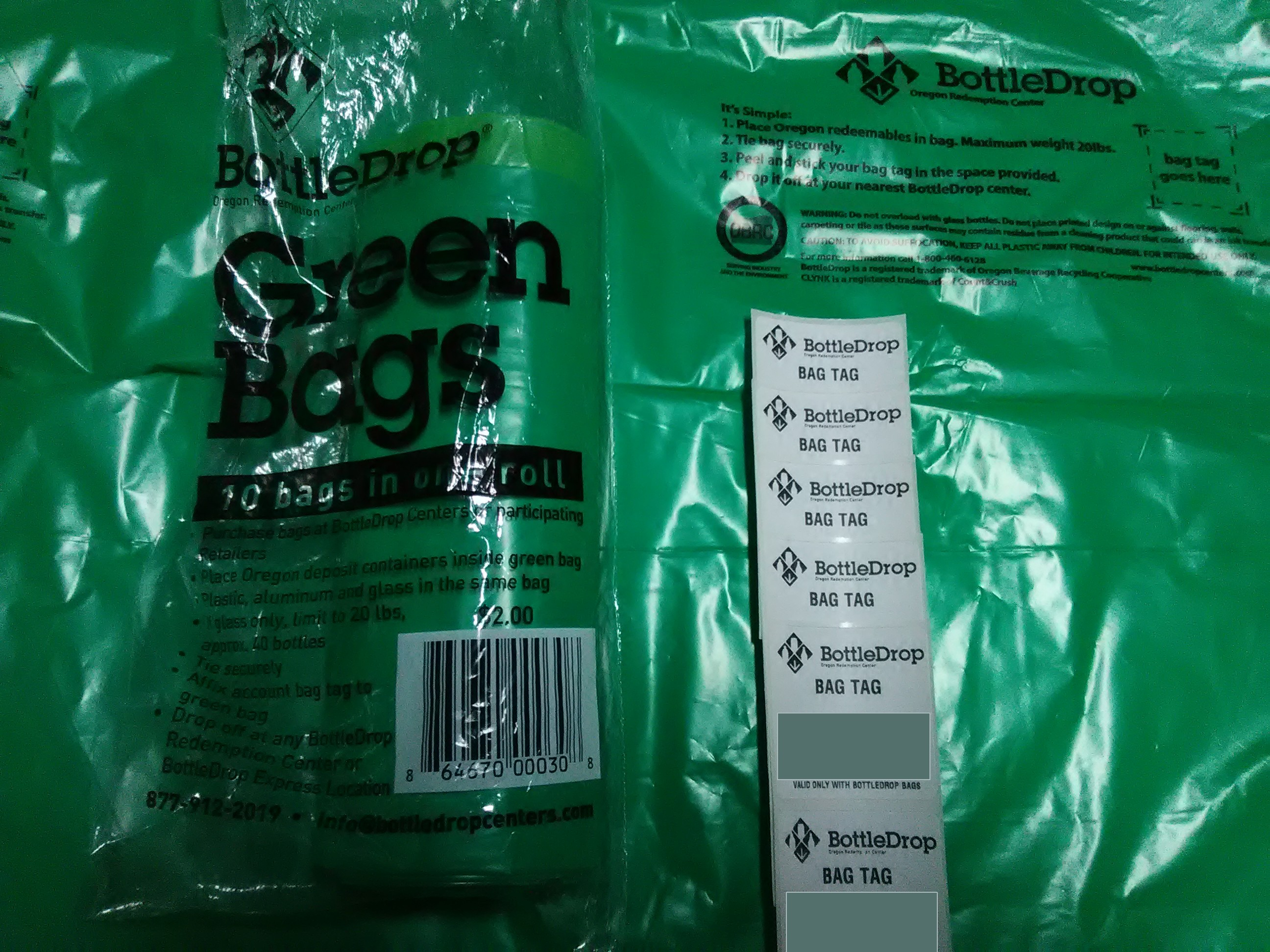
Green bag and bag tags printed from the kiosk for use with drop off service.

==== Reception ====
The redemption operator OBRC is rated "B+" by the Better Business Bureau as of June 2025 with the reasoning of having 21 complaints.

=== Concerns around fraudulent conduct ===
==== Theft from curbside bins and receptacles ====
It is unlawful under Oregon Revised Statutes 459A.080 to remove recyclable containers set aside for collection by a city or county collection service without the permission of the owner or generator of the contents, which includes going through curbside bins for containers with deposit value. It is also unlawful to remove recyclable material from a container, box, vehicle, depot or other receptacle for the accumulation or storage of recyclable material without permission of the receptacle's owner. Violation of ORS 459A.080 is a class A misdemeanor criminal offense per ORS 459.992(1)(d) In the Oregon Supreme Court case State v. Waterhouse, defendant, a scrapper, was found guilty of intentionally appropriating scrap metal having some value to himself.

===== Issues attributed to refundable container thefts =====
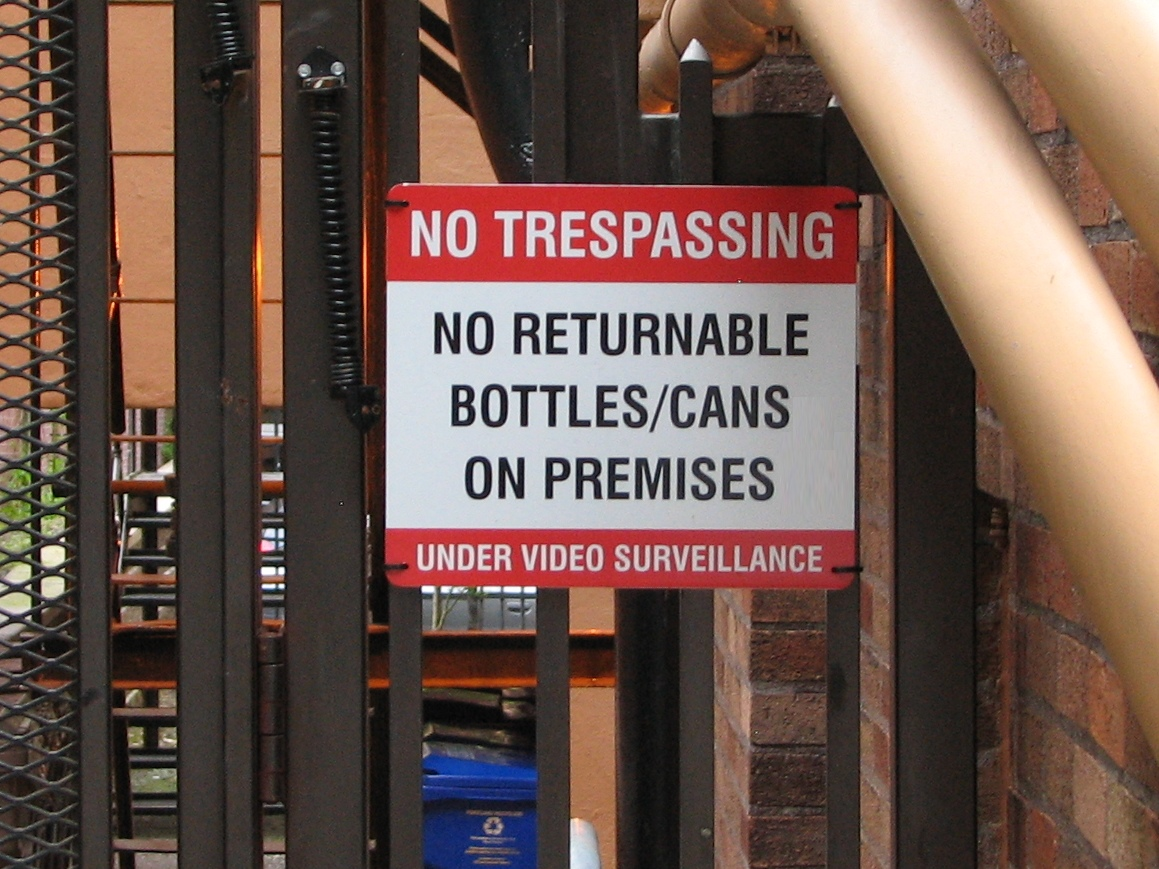
A signage posted in downtown Portland advising would-be trespassers that no returnable containers are kept on property

In December 2018, The Columbian reported neighbors in the Cascade Park neighborhood in Vancouver, Washington near the Oregon border have noticed thefts of cans and bottles as well as the curbside bins. A district manager for Waste Connections reported its subsidiary Columbia Resource Company that handles Clark County, Washington saw a 9% reduction in glass bottles returned after the deposit increased from 5 cents to 10 cents in Oregon in 2017. He attributes the likely cause to theft. Removal of contents from recycling bins or nearby them without the consent of the generator or the hauler is prohibited in Clark County. Waste Connections did not provide an exact number on thefts from recycling bins, but reported enough is removed and taken to Oregon to have a financial impact for Waste Connections which sells recyclable materials collected. The Columbian reported in June 2019 that reports of scavengers rummaging through recycling bins have increased in the past year. The newspaper reports scavengers target cans and bottles that have value across the Columbia river which undercuts the hauler as well as generating complaints from the public. Marty Smith, writing for the Willamette Week reports that community members in Vancouver started complaining about theft of cans and bottles from their recycling bins. To better track complaints related to recyclables scavenging, the Clark Regional Emergency Services Agency (CRESA), the police dispatch for Clark County is looking into a way of tracking scavenging complaints. In Washington state, scavenging is a crime of third degree theft. According to the city of Vancouver, scavenging is considered by law enforcement to be a gateway crime to other crimes such as illegal drugs and identity theft.

A video on the internet showing a woman dumping water into the sink at the BottleDrop redemption center in 2017 caused a community outrage and resulted in the woman being cited for theft of $40 worth of bottled water from Albertsons. Police commented that as she was seen cashing stolen goods, it could be a felony.

In a 2018 concession stand burglary at Douglas McKay High School in Salem, burglars emptied about ten cases of 24-pack beverages into a trash can inside the concession stand and stole the empty containers. School staff believed the theft motive was converting the stolen containers into cash at the nearby OBRC BottleDrop redemption center on Lancaster Drive.

In September 2019, Recology, a waste hauler operating in Ashland, told the Ashland Tidings that in addition to theft, its drivers were experiencing harassment by emboldened recyclables thieves that they had to improvise plans to deal with theft and harassment of drivers by thieves. Recology receives many calls from customers concerning people going through their bins. The company recommends that people not put out their redeemables, donating them to charities or redeeming them themselves to reduce this problem.

Oregon DEQ survey reports over half of 77 multi-family property managers interviewed identified the use of waste collection area by non-tenants, such as transients, a problem that cause issues such as contamination of recyclable materials. Oregon DEQ opined retrieval of returnable containers as the motivation for transients and other non-tenants to access the collection areas.

===== Redemption of previously redeemed containers =====
Jules Bailey, the chief stewardship officer for OBRC, told the Mail Tribune there have been instances of people attempting to redeem cans that have already been redeemed through a machine.

==== Fraudulent redemption of out-of-state containers ====
Redemption of out-of-state containers is considered a fraud and prohibited by the bottle bill. Retailers and redemption centers may refuse to accept containers when they have reasonable grounds to believe they were purchased outside of Oregon. Staff at some locations near the state border request receipts proving the containers being redeemed were purchased in Oregon. Fraudulent redemption has been a problem according to KATU news. As told to KATU reporter by a coop (OBRC) representative, the redemption center staff at Delta Park near the state boundary catches about 50 people per day from Washington. C-TRAN which operates public transit service that traverses between Vancouver, Washington and Portland have banned the carrying of empty beverage containers on their service for safety and sanitation reasons created by people who carry cans across the state line on their service to redeem them in Portland. In May 2019, Jules Bailey from OBRC said he did not know the magnitude of the problem, but said it is an issue with the return of Washington containers around the "Columbia corridor" and minimal issues with California or Idaho. Senate Bill 522 sponsored by senator Betsy Johnson from Scappoose fines those who bring out-of-state containers. The bill was passed and signed into law, making fraudulent redemption a Class D violation going into effect January 2020. Johnson told KGW, "retail grocers in her district every day are overwhelmed with massive bottle returns from the Washington side of the river, sometimes by the pickup load." During the public hearing, the store director for the St. Helens Safeway testified to the committee of seeing a dramatic increase in Washington residents returning containers and described that people arrive in Washington plate vehicles with cases of bottled water and emptying them on the parking lot to prepare the bottles to return into bottle machines at the Safeway location he manages. Northwest Grocery Association's president reported redemption rates at redemption centers near the Oregon state border have seen a sharp rise, sometimes over 100% following the deposit value increase in Oregon.

In the November 2020 State audit, OBRC reported the cost of cross-border fraud is "upwards of $10 million"; however, auditors could not verify OBRC's claim. In preparing the report, representatives from the Audits Division visited two BottleDrop redemption centers near the Washington border and they reported observing numerous people arriving in vehicles with Washington license plates or without any plates.

Argus Observer observed that a majority of vehicles parked in the parking lot during its visit in May 2013 to the Ontario, Oregon redemption centers had Idaho license plates.

As a cause to develop likely out-of-state purchases, businesses in Malheur County, Oregon have been refusing containers with Costco's private brand Kirkland on the reasoning that the nearest Costco in Nampa, Idaho is 36 miles away while the nearest one in Oregon in Bend, Oregon is 260 miles away.

==== Bottle deposit motivated welfare fraud "water dumping" ====
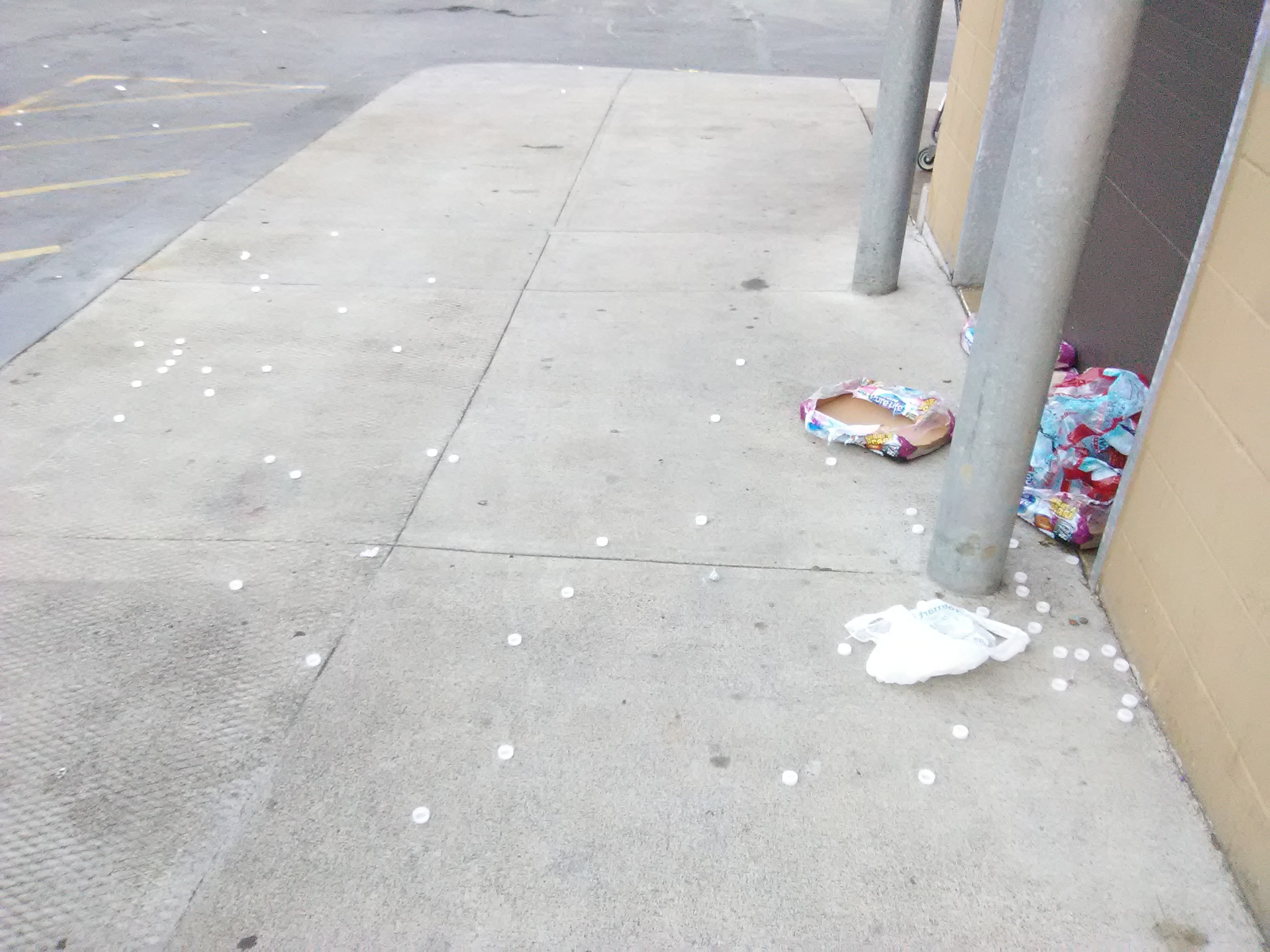
Packaging and lids from cases of bottled water dumped along a grocery store redemption area.

"Water dumping" is a term coined by the United States Department of Agriculture referring to a commonly perpetrated welfare fraud by cash-seeking welfare recipients purchasing bottled water so they can empty them out and redeem containers for the redemption value in cash. In September 2012, such scheme was not considered a fraud in Oregon. In February 2013, USDA expanded the Supplemental Nutrition Assistance Program fraud definition to include water dumping. The USDA intends to place repeat "water dumping" offenders on the nationwide lifetime SNAP ban list. In August 2019, KTVZ shared a video recorded by a grocery store employee in La Pine of a man dumping contents of soda that had been purchased with Oregon Trail SNAP card. According to the statement provided to the reporter by the employee, it was a common occurrence. Oregon Department of Human Services told KTVZ that it is considered fraud that may result in a termination of benefits, and the state is cracking down on this fraud this year. Springfield police observed a man and woman emptying bottles in September 2019. When contacted, the woman admitted to police that they were emptying water they had purchased on SNAP to cash the containers so they could use the money to purchase fuel. The woman was arrested on outstanding warrants and the police reported the water dumping incident to the Oregon Department of Human Services. KTVL reports a store manager they interviewed has seen people purchasing bottled water with SNAP, emptying them and returning to the store to redeem the containers for cash.

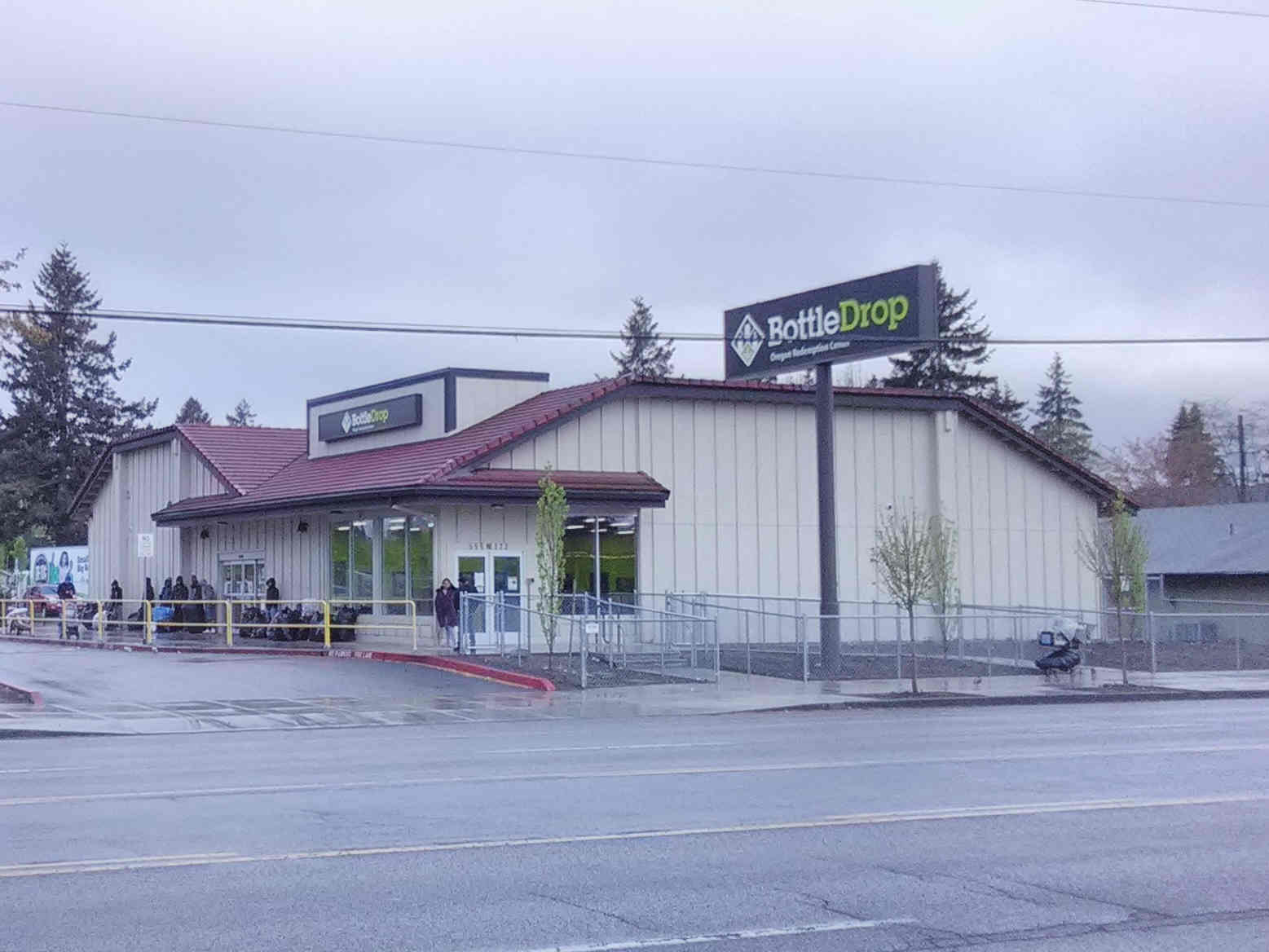
Glisan BottleDrop in NE Portland

=== Community concerns regarding beverage container redemption centers (BCRC) ===
To open a redemption center, it must be approved by OLCC. Redemption centers are associated with criminal activity. A site was proposed at southwest 17th Avenue and west Burnside Street in Portland in 2014. OLCC received about 200 comments, most of which were against the center. Stakeholders such as dozens of neighbors and businesses, including Portland Timbers and Portland Thorns FC, opposed the establishment of the beverage container redemption center. Many objections related to fears of vagrants and crime related to transients with shopping carts with scavenged cans flocking to the new redemption center. A redemption center was planned in Portland's St. Johns neighborhood in 2024 and this faced a strong opposition by hundreds of St. Johns community members. The city has received over 650 emails voicing opposition to the redemption center. The North Portland redemption center which opened in 2014 has been the subject of complaints by nearby businesses for years closed at the end of July 2026 as the landlord chose not to renew the lease. While establishing a replacement location was considered, the plan was ultimately abandoned. Instead, a bag deposit station has been added to nine grocery store locations which is described as a way to address issues of loitering and crime that goes with redemption centers.

A redemption center is being considered for opening in July 2026 in the Hosford-Abernethy neighborhood in Southeast Portland, although concerned neighbors are objecting, citing previous issues at OBRC's other redemption centers such as trash, crime, camping, and drug activities that have been documented at the Delta Park location. 1,200 people signed the petition opposing the establishment of the Hosford-Abernethy redemption center.

A security guard employed by a company, Fortified International, working at the Oregon Beverage Recycling Cooperative's Glisan BottleDrop in Northeast Portland stabbed a man on the job while confronting people who were allegedly using drugs in a nearby parking lot. The security guard, Arturo Troncoso Jr was arrested and charged with second-degree assault. A lawsuit was filed by the victim against the OBRC and the guard's employer Fortified International.

==== Beaverton ====
A redemption center opened up in May, 2017 in Beaverton. KATU's Andrew Reed reports neighbors report BottleDrop brought in people "who routinely act suspicious and are causing problems" in the neighborhood. A nearby veterinarian interviewed reports BottleDrop "brought a wave of problems to his property". He reports one of his business' security cameras was ripped off and had someone break into his veterinary clinic's bathroom to use drugs. In addition, he reports shopping carts getting left on his property almost daily, as well as finding bottles of urine, offering a list of issues of security, noise, odor, traffic, littering, drug paraphernalia, and transients. A resident behind the redemption center reported seeing public urination and became suspicious of people he believes to be acting suspiciously near his home. The dean of students for Jesuit High School commented "Our school is less safe now" referring to the presence of OBRC's BottleDrop redemption center. Supporters of the center were the Oregon Food Bank which participates in its fundraising program and two science teachers from Meadow Park Middle School, which is approximately four miles from the site.

==== Bend ====
In September 2017, KTVZ described that businesses near the Bend BottleDrop Center have "noticed a difference in the neighborhood ever since the Bottle Drop moved in". The news reporter described that businesses have seen transient encampments nearby and felt the BottleDrop attracts transients. In 2017, Bend police responded to 270 calls at the BottleDrop. In the four months leading up to when the story was written on July 16, 2018, two subjects were arrested for offensive littering, and 11 were arrested for drug offenses at the BottleDrop property. Bend Police arrested 24 people in 4-months period leading up to July 12, 2018 around the BottleDrop for matters such as drug possession, stealing shopping carts from retailers and offensive littering. In April 2020, Bend Police again identified the area around Bend BottleDrop as a site of ongoing complaints about drug use, theft, littering, abandoned shopping carts and criminal mischief and conducted a focused enforcement operation resulting in several arrests.

==== Medford ====
In June 2018, Damian Mann of Mail Tribune reports nearby business owners say the OBRC's redemption center has been a " magnet for methamphetamine 'tweakers" who cash in their bottles and head out to buy drugs and "unsavory behavior". These Medford businesses also said they began noticing vagrancy, theft, and vandalism ever since the BottleDrop redemption center opened. In 2018, the owner of Southern Oregon Crane in Medford testified to the city council, "It’s like living right next to a crack house," in reference to the redemption center. The Medford redemption center opened in November 2014 and it was the 10th one to open in the state.

==== Portland Delta Park ====
On March 27, 2020, Delta Park BottleDrop's landlord TMT Development issued a notice of default citing health and safety concerns. After a long line started to form outside the store, TMT stated BottleDrop had not been managing social distancing requirements relating to the COVID-19 pandemic. The notice directed them to comply with 6 ft social distancing rule or face eviction. The same weekend, the police were called to the redemption center after a man made death threats. TMT Development's CEO said nearby businesses have complained about BottleDrop's patrons blocking their doors, standing too close together as well as violence, according to The Oregonian. In April, TMT Development installed a fence around a grassy property after drug needles were found. TMT has also deployed armed guards to prevent people from queuing up in the parking lot or in front of other businesses. This area has been used by BottleDrop's customers, but it is not part of the formal lease agreement. TMT's president cites they needed to step in to prevent fights and drug dealing. The manager of a sporting goods store interviewed by Willamette Week said he's seen drug deals and fights in front of the OBRC's BottleDrop. The police responded to the Delta Park BottleDrop location 67 times in 2023. Complaints have been getting filed for years about litter and crime around this site. When Aimee Green of The Oregonian visited OBRC's Delta Park BottleDrop in May 2025, she observed an individual smoking drugs off the spoon in the waiting line. This location amassed complaints from nearby businesses about crime and drug activities around the redemption center before it closed in July 2026.

== Retailer requirements ==
Retailers are required to refund the deposit to consumers when they present containers as set forth by the bottle bill. The requirements are dependent on whether the store is under 5,000 square feet or greater than or equal to 5,000 square feet, distance from the redemption center, and the retailer's participation in the program.

Reverse vending machines are optional. Retailers are required to accept containers whether or not they have a machine or if their machine is working; being busy is not an exception to this obligation. Retailers are required to accept crushed or damaged containers if the brand and Oregon 10c marking are visible and customers are entitled to ask for a hand count on containers with refund value rejected by the store's machine.

=== Situations when returns can be refused ===
Retailers and redemption centers may refuse containers contaminated with anything other than ordinary dust, the original contents, or water. Additionally, when staff have reasonable grounds to suspect the containers were not purchased in Oregon. Redemption centers use individuals arriving in a vehicle with Washington license plates as a reasonable ground to suspect they were purchased outside Oregon unless they can prove the beverages were purchased in Oregon. If there are reasonable grounds, retailers may request a receipt. The OLCC says retailers should reject containers that have been flattened by a reverse vending machine, as it is an indication that they have already been redeemed. OLCC describes cans that have already been through the machine as being characterized by "small square indentations or perforations and will be fairly symmetrically crushed," and plastic bottles will have a crushed neck.

=== Over 5,000 square feet ===
Participating retailers over 5,000 square feet within two miles (zone 1) from a redemption center are not required to accept any container. If in zone 2 (up to 3 1/2 miles from center), they are required to accept 24 per person, per day. Retailers outside of the zone are required to accept 144. Retailers within the zone that choose not to participate in the redemption center program are required to accept 350 containers per person per day.

=== Under 5,000 square feet ===
They're required to accept 24 containers per person per day if they're within either zone 1 or zone 2 of the redemption center.

Retailers under 5,000 square feet (small shops, convenience stores, and the like) outside the two zones are allowed to limit the quantity to 50 containers per person per day. They can also limit them to the brand and size they sell.

Within these limitations, retailers are required to accept containers, and it is unlawful for retailers to refuse containers unless:

1. Containers are damaged to the extent that the brand cannot be read
2. Contaminated with anything other than ordinary dust, water or contents.

Bottle return machines are provided for retailers' convenience. Even when machines are broken, retailers continue to have legal obligations to accept containers, even if they have to hand count them.

=== Unlawful refusal ===
In 2025, The Oregonian newspaper found unlawful refusal of containers at convenience store is "pervasive". 7 out of 10 convenience stores contacted by the newspaper refused to accept containers,s while one location set its own quantity limit arbitrarily. In December 2022, the Market of Choice location in the Central Eastside neighborhood of Portland started refusing bottle returns while fully aware of their obligations under law to process bottle redemptions. Market of Choice chose to be fined and rather than comply with the law.

== Redemption value flow ==
State law mandates a payment of redemption value upon presentation of the container. Deposit initiation is not required, and charging a deposit to consumers is voluntary. Bottle deposit is generally initiated by distributors and charged on each transaction. Covered products sold within the State of Oregon must read "OR 10c" for compliance purposes. For redemption purposes, OBRC's BottleDrop service will redeem all covered containers regardless of marking. Deposit that is not redeemed is kept by distributors such as Columbia Distributing and Maletis Beverages. Willamette Week's Nigel Jaquiss was uncertain about the environmental benefits but opined, "the increase will create a big payday for the companies that distribute beer and soda." The Oregon legislature has given the OLCC the authority to enforce and administer the Bottle Bill.

In 2016, OLCC refused to release the monetary value of the deposit kept by distributors when Willamette Week asked for it. OLCC responded, "We are forbidden from releasing any numbers other than a percentage". The newspaper appealed to the Oregon Department of Justice, which ordered the numbers be released as a matter of public record in September 2016. The newspaper said that the beverage industry lobbyist Paul Romain said the distributor wanted the individual companies' numbers private. The data showed that distributors were keeping about $30 million annually. OBRC had 450 employees and a budget of $44 million for 2019. During the same year, $29 million of the budget was paid for with unredeemed bottles. Remaining were paid by cash contributions from grocers and distributors.

== Returned material process ==
OBRC, a group of deposit-initiating distributors, administers the collection and transportation of deposit-bearing containers. Containers that are recycled through curbside recycling are not counted towards redemption rate statistics and waste haulers do not receive the redemption value. The value of scrap materials sold is not included in the OBRC's operating budget. OBRC distributes the revenue from selling recyclable materials to distributors that form the cooperative membership. The disbursement amount to individual cooperative members is determined based on the proportion of containers and materials returned that are attributed to each member. OBRC does not release these figures to OLCC, however the state auditor's report estimated the OBRC disbursed $19.08 million in 2018 and $17.05 million in 2019 to its beverage distributor members from selling scrap materials from returned containers and most of value comes from aluminum. The OBRC reports an annual volume of: 21.3 million pounds (10,600 short tons) of aluminum, 13.4 million pounds (6,700 short tons) of PET, and 104 million pounds (52,000 short tons) of glass. In 2017, OBRC's expenses were $34 million. $9 million of which was paid by distributors and $25 million was paid by the unredeemed deposit.

The green bags used for BottleDrop drop off is landfilled after the contents are processed. All glass bottles that are returned for redemption under the Oregon Bottle Bill are processed at Owens-Brockway plant located in the Cully neighborhood in Portland. This plant was fined $1 million by the Oregon DEQ for environmental violations in June 2021.

== History ==
Oregon's 1971 Beverage Container Act (ORS 459A.700 to 459A.740) was the first such legislation passed in the United States. It went into effect on October 1, 1972.

=== 1970s ===
Before the formal 1971 Oregon Bottle Bill, Oregon had already set up a less formal bottle return system that most stores and some of the public cooperated with. Inspired by the early Vermont bottle return system before it was repealed, Oregon's limited system paid 1 cent for beer bottles and cans and 3 cents for soda bottles and cans. It was started in the mid-1950s and lasted through the rest of the 50s, throughout the 1960s, and into the early 70s until the more formal and expanded Bottle Bill was enacted. The emphasis was on bottles, as bottles were washed and reused for fresh product sold to the public before health laws were enacted that stopped the re-wash system. And because of the low payout for the return of bottles and cans, and in spite of various anti-litter PSA advertising campaigns on Oregon television, only a relatively small percentage of Oregonians participated in the return of bottles and cans. As a result, many bottles and cans still littered Oregon's highways and scenic areas throughout this entire early bottle-can recycling period.

Richard Chambers, a logging equipment salesman, collected litter during his hiking, climbing, and kayaking throughout the state. In 1968, he called Oregon State Representative Paul Hanneman, whom Chambers knew well, after he was inspired by a small newspaper article about British Columbia wanting to ban non-refundable bottles and cans. Chambers wanted a deposit on bottles and cans to encourage people to return them to the store.

Chambers began a letter-writing campaign, using non-ordinary stationery and stamps to draw the attention of his intended audience. Oregon House Bill 1157 was introduced and assigned to the House State and Federal Affairs Committee. Chambers brought in people to testify for the bill, including a river guide to testify about the amount of beverage package litter in the water, and a farmer who lost four cows because of ingestion of glass and metal shards from beverage containers. Beverage container materials companies and bottling companies fought the bill. Hanneman offered the compromise of not banning non-returnables but instead requiring a five-cent deposit as an incentive for return. By a 5-to-4 vote, the bill was sent to the House floor, where it fell 3 votes short of passage, with 27 of 60 members voting for it. Governor Tom McCall had already offered his support for the bill, so Hanneman asked McCall to help sway the House's vote in favor of passage. McCall refused, advising that he did not want a Bottle Bill in that legislative session. McCall planned to endorse the anti-littering campaign espoused by the Keep America Beautiful non-profit in 1970 and wait until 1971 to support the Bottle Bill. It has been written that this delay was intentional on McCall's part to make the bill his. After its defeat, Chambers continued his letter-writing campaign.

After McCall refused to back the Bottle Bill in 1969, he sponsored the formation of non-profit SOLV—Stop Oregon Litter and Vandalism. In 1971, it was reported that 75% of SOLV's budget was derived from organizations opposing the bottle bill. SOLV also received state funds.

In 1970, McCall initiated his own campaign for the Bottle Bill. Bill Chambers and Don Waggoner (1935–2016) worked to get the bill approved. Among opponents of the bill were beverage companies who feared financial strains with the processing of returns.

The new bill, House Bill 1036, banned non-returnables and placed a five-cent deposit on bottles and cans containing beer, malt beverage, mineral and soda waters and carbonated soft drinks. The law went into effect on October 1, 1972. The law mandated beer, malt liquor, and carbonated soft drinks in refillable containers that were certified for use by multiple manufacturers to have a minimum of 2 cents per container deposit. Those beverages in other types of containers were required to have a 5-cent refund value.

==== The first 6 months into the bottle bill ====
Prior to the Bottle Bill becoming enacted, about 51% of soft drinks were sold in refillable glass bottles, 41% in cans and 8% in non-refillable glass bottles. In December 1971, the OLCC estimated about 35% of beer sold in Oregon were sold in cans. In December 1972, 99.5% of beer was sold in bottles, with the remainder being sold in cans.

In March 1973, all soft drinks sold in Oregon were in refillable bottles, except for less than 1% that were sold in cans.

In March 1973, prices, beer cited as an example, cost $1.58 for a six-pack including a 30-cent deposit in non-refillable containers and $1.17 for 6 in refillable bottles, which included a 12-cent deposit.

In 1974, the state reported that litter of beverage containers had been reduced by 83 percent.

=== 1990s to present ===
In 1996, voters rejected a ballot measure that would have extended the bottle bill. In 2005, Republican Party Representative Vicki Berger (daughter of Chambers) introduced another bill to extend the bottle bill, but it was defeated in the Senate.

On June 7, 2007, Governor Ted Kulongoski signed Senate Bill 707 into law, which added water bottles to the refund law. The law went into effect January 1, 2009. Of the nine states that had bottle bill laws at that time, only Maine, California, and Hawaii included water bottles.

The 2007 legislature also created a task force, charged with making recommendations for further updating of the Bottle Bill to the 2009 legislature. Updates under consideration in the late 2000s included adding products like wine and juice bottles, and increasing the refund amount from 5 cents.

The Container Recycling Institute estimates that 125 million disposable water bottles were sold in Oregon in 2005, more than the number of soft drink bottles, and the recycling rate for water bottles was 32 percent, compared with 82 percent for beer and soft drink bottles. Container Recycling Institute is a research and advocacy group in support of the bottle bill.

OLCC approved redemption centers run by distributors on an experimental basis in early 2010. Two locations were opened, one in Wood Village and another in Oregon City. By April 2017, there were 16 redemption centers. The first redemption center intended to replace redemption at retail stores opened in Wood Village in September 2010 and it included bag drop off service as well. For decades, bottle returns were done exclusively through retail stores. In 2008, Oregon and Michigan were the only bottle deposit states without a redemption center and also had the highest redemption rates.

On April 1, 2017, the refund value was increased to 10 cents per container from 5 cents per container. This was the first increase in the history of Oregon Bottle Bill. The change was triggered by a provision of state law enacted by the legislature in 2011, which called for refund value increase to 10 cents if the return rate for containers fell below 80 percent for two consecutive years. The return rate was 64.5% in 2015 and 68.3% in 2014. The return rate is not an indication of the recycling rate. Containers recycled through curbside recycling are not accounted for in the return rate.

The next change came into effect in January 2018, when additional categories of beverages were required to have a deposit.

2019: Modification to include all kombucha and hard seltzer 3 liters and under into covered beverages. (SB 247). SB 522 was signed into law, making fraudulent redemption of out-of-state containers a violation punishable by a fine up to $250.

Also in 2019, dealer redemption center was enacted under SB 93, which was sponsored by OBRC. Dealer redemption centers are stores that have partnered with OBRC to allow containers to be dropped off in bulk in bags from8 AMM-8 PM and allowing partnered stores to limit individual container returns to 24 per day. The service must be provided without charge and redemption value paid within one week bags being dropped off.

January 2020: The act of returning containers fraudulent became a violation effective January 1, 2020. The OLCC announced the addition of 4oz to 1.5 liter sized Kefir, drinkable yogurt, milk-based smoothies and other beverages which are mostly milk or milk substitute with additions of other ingredients. Milk and plant-based milk substitutes are not covered, however, OLCC withdrew the decision on February 5, 2020 out of concerns about the effects of milk residue on process equipment. In the 2018 expansion, Kefir was exempt from having a refund value.

A 2020 audit conducted by the state recommends shifting some or all of unclaimed deposits to the state. Throughout the history of Oregon Bottle Bill, these funds have been kept by the beverage industry. The 2020 Secretary of State audit recommends all or portions of unredeemed deposit to be remitted to the state for recycling or environmental program as done in all states with bottle deposit except Oregon and Iowa instead of letting OBRC keep it.

==== 2022 expansion ====
Bottle Bill was expanded in June 2022 to include wine in cans, which will become redeemable starting on July 1, 2025.

Statewide redemption rate
year	rate
2022	85.5%
2021	80.60%
2020	77.21%
2019	85.78%
2018	81.02%
2017	73.33%
2016	64.31%
2015	64.45%
2014	68.26%
2013	70.97%
2012	70.95%

==== Temporary redemption suspension ====
Bottle redemption enforcement has been suspended twice in the history of Oregon Bottle Bill.

During a part of the COVID-19 pandemic, OLCC temporarily modified the retailer requirements several times. On March 15, 2020, OLCC allowed grocery stores to stop accepting bottle returns during the COVID-19 pandemic through at least the end of May 2020; The Bottle Bill reprieve was amended on May 22, so that enforcement begins two weeks after the county in which the store is located in has entered phased 1 of reopening schedule. Enforcement was re-suspended in counties that reverted to the baseline phase. A modification was made to bottle bill requirements during phase 1 reopening, allowing retailers that are not open 24 hours a day to limit bottle return hours to 8 AM to 6 PM. For retailers that are open 24 hours, they were allowed to limit to 7 AM to 11 PM. Bottle bill enforcement was suspended in March 2020, and again on November 18, 2020. The suspension remained in place in individual counties until the COVID-19 risk category as defined by the Oregon Health Authority is no longer "extreme" or "high". Enforcement resumes five days after the respective county is classified as "low" or "medium" by the Oregon Health Authority, and suspension is resumed if the status reverts to high or extreme. Retailers in counties classified as "low" or "medium" were allowed to a reduce acceptance hours to 8AM to 6PM for stores that are not open 24 hours and 7AM to 11PM for stores open 24 hours. All pandemic related variance to the Bottle Bill requirements ended on July 5, 2021.

Portland, Multnomah County and State officials said drug addicts are using bottle redemption as a source of funding to buy fentanyl. Oregon governor Tina Kotek and local officials ordered the suspension of bottle redemption at two downtown Portland stores as part of the "90-day fentanyl emergency" to address neighborhood impacts such as drugs, crime, and homelessness among other issues. The suspension was originally for March 2024, but it was extended until May 1, 2024. Redeeming cans to obtain money to purchase drugs is part of the problem. Downtown residents have complained that retailers being obligated to issue cash refunds attracted people who use the money from bottle redemption to buy drugs and use them nearby. The two stores issued exemptions were downtown Safeway and a Plaid Pantry location close-by. A week into the exemption, other retailers started seeking exemption as well.

==== 2025 ====
Effective July 1st 2025, canned wine, cider over 8.5% alcohol by volume, sake, and mead are included in the Oregon bottle bill. Retailers are also allowed to limit all bottle redemption hours to 8 AM to 8 PM. Previously, they were required to accept bottle returns whenever they're open for business. Another change is the creation of non-profit-operated "alternative redemption centers" in Portland city limits (or cities with 500,000 or more population) intended to serve can gatherers who redeem cans daily or almost daily. Large retailers in a 3.5-mile radius of an "alternative center" can choose between hosting a bag drop-off location or paying towards funding the "alternative redemption" center. As of October 2026, large retailers have chosen to support bag return sites at grocery store locations. The City of Portland has ordered the current bottle return site under the Morrison Bridge to shut down by January 31, 2027. The site was opened during the COVID-19 pandemic when grocers were temporarily allowed to stop accepting container returns.

Under temporary rules that went into effect on June 4, 2025, retailers may restrict bottle returns to the hours of 8 AM to 8 PM, and grocers in City of Portland who accept green bags are exempt from having to accept loose containers.

== Context ==
Deposits on refillable glass bottles were the norm well before the 1930s, at which time the disposable steel beverage can began to slowly displace glass. By 1960, almost half of U.S. beer was in cans, while only five percent of soft drinks were not in bottles.

Vermont passed the first "bottle bill" in 1953, but it only banned non-refillable bottles and did not introduce a deposit system. It expired in 1957 after beer industry lobbying.

British Columbia enacted North America's oldest beverage deposit system in 1970.

Beverage containers constituted 58% of litter in Kentucky in 1999. States that have adopted bottle deposits have reduced litter as much as 64%. The container deposit system cost averages 1.53 cents per container (versus 1.25 cents for other collection systems) and is more than two and a half times more effective at recycling containers.

By 1968, beer and soda companies were responsible for 173 million bottles and 263 million cans each year in Oregon.

=== Oregon Beverage Recycling Cooperative ===
OBRC is the industry steward for the bottle bill and receives all unclaimed deposits. It was formed in 2009 through the merger of Beverage Recyclers of Oregon and Container Recovery Inc. It represents 96% of beverage distributors in Oregon and operates the BottleDrop redemption centers and green bag program. It is the primary stakeholder of the Oregon Bottle Bill. While the OLCC oversees the bottle bill, OLCC's oversight over OBRC is limited. San Francisco's bag return program BottleBank is based on its green bag system used in Oregon.

== See also ==
- Container deposit legislation in the United States
- Environment of the United States
