= Curtis Wolfer =

American politician

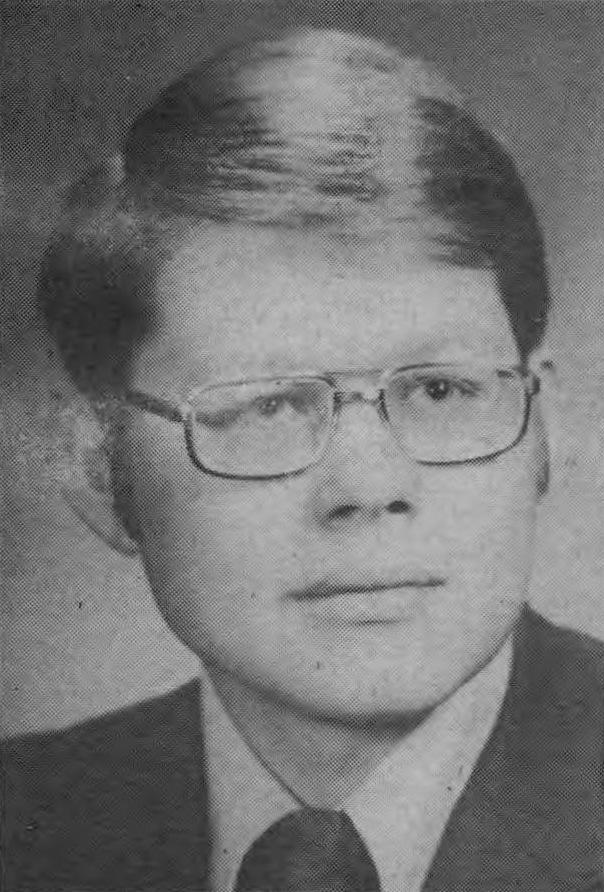

Member of the Oregon House of Representatives from the 28th district
- In office 1973–1981

Personal details
- Born: February 17, 1949 (age 77) Salem, Oregon
- Party: Democratic
- Profession: Investment manager

Curtis Wolfer (born February 17, 1949), was an American politician who was a member of the Oregon House of Representatives. He was an investment manager.
