= Gary Wilhelms =

American politician (born 1938)

Member of the Oregon House of Representatives from the 53rd district
- In office 1973–1979

Personal details
- Born: Gary Lee Wilhelms; January 17, 1938 (age 88) Astoria, Oregon, U.S.
- Party: Republican
- Education: Eastern Oregon University
- Profession: telecommunications industry representative

Gary Lee Wilhelms (born January 17, 1938) was an American politician who was a member of the Oregon House of Representatives. He was House Republican Leader in 1979.

Wilhelms was born in Astoria, Oregon and was a Manager for Pacific Northwest Bell. In 2011, Wilhelms was named Chief of Staff for Kevin Cameron, Oregon House Republican Leader. He also served as Chief of Staff for House Speakers Karen Minnis and Lynn Snodgrass and as Assistant to Senate President Brady Adams. Wilhelms Co-Chaired the Public Commission on the Oregon Legislature and served as a member of the Oregon Government Ethics Commission.
