= Dick Magruder =

American politician

- State Representative Dick Magruder

Member of the Oregon House of Representatives from the 2nd and 1st district
- In office 1971–1978
- Preceded by: Wayne Turner
- Succeeded by: Caroline Magruder

Personal details
- Born: August 7, 1946 Portland, Oregon
- Died: June 19, 1978 (aged 31) Clatskanie, Oregon
- Party: Democratic
- Occupation: Rancher and attorney

Richard B. Magruder (August 7, 1946 – June 19, 1978) was a rancher, lawyer, and Oregon state legislator. He attended college and then law school at Willamette University. After graduation, he practiced law and operated a ranch in Clatskanie in Columbia County, Oregon. He served four terms in the Oregon House of Representatives, from 1971 until his death in 1978. During the 1977 legislative session, he came within one vote of being elected speaker of the House of Representatives.

== Early life ==
Magruder was born in Portland, Oregon, in 1946, the son of Kent and Caroline Magruder. He grew up on a farm in Columbia County owned by his family since 1905. As a youth, Magruder participated in 4-H farming activities. He raised champion sheep that were shown at the Oregon State Fair from 1957 through 1962. In 1964, one of his steers won champion honors at the State Fair. That same year, Magruder won the state's highest 4-H achievement award for his accomplishments. By the time he left for college in 1964, he was the top crop and livestock judge at the Columbia County Fair.

Magruder attended Willamette University, receiving a Bachelor of Arts degree in 1968. He then attended law school at Willamette. While he was a law student, Magruder became chairman of the Columbia County Democratic Central Committee and was also a member of the Oregon Democratic Central Committee. During his final year in law school, Magruder ran for a seat in the Oregon House of Representatives and won. He finished his law school course work at the end of 1970 and received a Doctor of Jurisprudence degree the following spring.

After law school, Magruder moved home to Clatskanie where he managed his family's 3,000-acre (12 km^{2}) ranch. He also opened a part-time law practice in a local livestock feed store. Magruder was a member of the Columbia County Livestock Association, the Oregon Cattlemen's Association, and the Oregon Sheep Growers Association.

== Political career ==
In 1970, at the age of 23, Magruder ran as a Democrat for the District 2 seat in the state House of Representatives. At that time, District 2 represented Columbia County, a mostly rural county along the Columbia River in northwestern Oregon. In the Democratic primary, Magruder defeated the seven-term incumbent, Wayne Turner, by a margin of more than a two-to-one. In the November general election, he easily defeated his Republican opponent, once again winning with a two-to-one margin. He took his seat in the state legislature in January 1971 and served through mid-June when the legislature's regular session ended.

After the 1971 legislative session, the House of Representatives was re-districted and Magruder's home in Clatskanie became part of District 1. The new district included Columbia County and parts of Washington County. In 1972, he ran for the House seat in District 1. In a re-match of the 1970 Democratic primary, Magruder beat former state representative Wayne Turner, receiving 61 percent of the vote. No Republicans filed for the District 1 seat so Magruder was unopposed in the general election. Following his re-election, he served in the regular legislative session from January through July 1973 and then a special session from mid-January through mid-February 1974.

Magruder was re-elected in 1974 and 1976. In 1974, he won the Democratic primary with 64 percent of the vote. He was unopposed in the general election. His re-election allowed him to serve in the legislature's 1975 regular session plus a special session in December 1975. During that time, he was instrumental in establishing the College of Veterinary Medicine at Oregon State University and funding a new building to house the college. In 1976, Magruder easily beat two opponents in the Democratic primary, receiving 68 percent of the vote. However, he faced a tough opponent in the general election. Because of his conservative voting record in the House of Representative, his Republican opponent was endorsed by the AFL–CIO and the Oregon Education Association. At the same time, Magruder was endorsed by Oregon's largest newspaper, The Oregonian. In November, Magruder was re-elected with 52 percent of the vote.

During the turbulent 1977 legislative session, Magruder helped build a coalition of Republicans and moderate and conservative Democrats that ultimately stripped the Democratic speaker, Philip D. Lang, of his power. At the beginning of the session, Magruder joined with House Republican leader Roger E. Martin and a small group of conservative Democrat to oppose the Democratic caucus' choice for speaker. As a result, Magruder came within one vote of being elected speaker. After Lang was elected speaker, he appointed Magruder as chairman of the powerful Ways and Means Committee. However, Magruder's conservative fiscal views put him at odds with House liberals including the Speaker. This on-going conflict encouraged further cooperation between conservative Democrats led by Magruder and the Republican minority in the House. The influence of this coalition continued to grow throughout the legislative session. In May 1977, a small group of moderate Democrats joined the coalition. In a quick legislative move, the expanded coalition voted to transfer the speaker's power to the House Rules Committee which was controlled by the coalition leaders. While the speaker was not removed from office, the Rules Committee took control of virtually every aspect of House operations. As a member of the Rules Committee, Magruder played a key role in setting the legislative agenda for the remainder of the 1977 session.

In 1978, Magruder ran for another term in the Oregon House of Representatives. In the May primary election, he lost the Democratic nomination to Garland Brown. The race was very close with Maguder winning in Washington County by 288 votes and losing in Columbia County by just a few votes more. At the same time, Magruder won the Republican primary with write-in votes. This could have allowed him to run again in the November general election. However, before he made any announcements about his political future, Magruder was killed in a farm accident.

== Death ==
On June 19, 1978, Magruder was killed while working on his ranch near Clatskanie. He was using a farm tractor to free another tractor stuck in a muddy meadow when his tractor flipped over backwards, crushing him.

Despite his many political battles, Magruder was well liked by everyone at the Oregon State Capitol. Even urban liberals, who he routinely hindered and vexed, were personal friends. The House Speaker, Phil Lang, said:

His great concern for fiscal responsibility and his commitment to the concept of a citizen legislature attests to his wisdom. His leadership for the rural and farming areas of our state, along with his keen mind and wry wit, will be sorely missed by his colleagues.

Oregon's governor, Robert W. Straub, praised Magruder, saying:

He was a man of high ability and strong independence. He had a joy for life and a sense of humor that made it a pleasure to be around him and work with him, even when we disagreed.

On June 22, 1978, a memorial service for Magruder was held in the House chamber at the Oregon State Capitol. Over 500 people attended the service.

== Legacy ==
After Magruder's death, Oregon law required the Columbia and Washington county commissioners to select another Democrat to fill the remaining six months of his two-year term in the Oregon House of Representatives. Instead of selecting Garland Brown, who had beaten Magruder in the Democratic primary a month before his death, the commissioners selected Magruder's mother, Caroline, to finish his term. Since Magruder had won the Republican primary with write-in votes, his death created the opportunity for the local Republican committee to nominate a new candidate to represent their party in the general election. Instead of selecting a Republican, the committee chose Caroline Magruder, a Democrat. As a result, Brown faced a newly appointed incumbent Democrat, Caroline Magruder, in the 1978 general election. In the November election, Mrs. Magruder beat Brown, taking her son's seat in the state legislature.

During a special session in September 1978, the Oregon legislature directed the state's Board of Higher Education to name the new veterinary school at Oregon State University after Magruder. In 1979, Oregon State University began construction of a $8.5 million facility to house the university's college of veterinary medicine. The building was completed in 1980 and named Magruder Hall.

Every year, Oregon State University awards the Dick Magruder Memorial Scholarship to a number of students majoring in veterinary medicine. The scholarship recognizes Magruder for his leadership in establishing the university's veterinary college. As of 2014, the scholarship provides $1,000 to selected students.
