= Ed Lindquist =

American politician

Member of the Oregon House of Representatives from the 26th district
- In office 1973–1983

Personal details
- Born: February 14, 1938 (age 88) Portland, Oregon
- Party: Democratic
- Profession: Firefighter

Edward Harold Lindquist (born February 14, 1938) is a former American politician who was a member of the Oregon House of Representatives. He was a firefighter.
