= Paul E. Walden =

American politician

Paul Ernest Walden (May 7, 1917 – March 28, 2003) was a radio broadcaster who served in the Oregon House of Representatives. He served three terms. U.S. Representative Greg Walden is his son.

From 1954 to 1956, Walden was president/chairman of the Oregon Association of Broadcasters.

== See also ==
- KODL
