= George F. Wingard =

American businessman and politician (born 1935)

Member of the Oregon Senate from the 20th district
- In office 1971–1983
- Succeeded by: Margie Hendriksen

Personal details
- Born: November 6, 1935 (age 90) Amboy, Washington
- Party: Democratic
- Spouse: Rhea
- Children: Carol, Gail, George
- Profession: Real Estate, Multi-family construction builder, Doctorate in archeology and local businessman.

George F. Wingard (born November 6, 1935) is an American businessman who served as a member of the Oregon House of Representatives and Oregon State Senate.

He was born in Amboy, Washington, and attended the University of Oregon. He was a builder and businessman. Wingard served one term in the Oregon House of Representatives from 1969 to 1971 prior to his election to the senate. He ran for State Treasurer of Oregon in 1980 and 1992. He also served on the city council of Eugene, Oregon. Outside of politics, he is an antique race car restorer and race car driver at Laguna Seca and at the Goodwood Festival of Speed.
