= Phil Lang =

American politician (1929–2024)

Philip D. Lang

54th Speaker of the Oregon House of Representatives
- In office 1975–1978
- Preceded by: Richard O. Eymann
- Succeeded by: Hardy Myers

Member of the Oregon House of Representatives from the 10th district
- In office 1961–1979

Personal details
- Born: December 16, 1929 Portland, Oregon, U.S.
- Died: December 29, 2024 (aged 95)
- Party: Democratic
- Education: Lewis & Clark College
- Profession: insurance executive

Military service
- Branch/service: U.S. Air Force

Philip David Lang (December 16, 1929 – December 29, 2024) was an American politician who was a member of the Oregon House of Representatives, including serving as speaker. An Oregon native, he was an insurance executive for decades and chair of the Oregon Liquor Control Commission (now Oregon Liquor and Cannabis Commission).

== Early life ==
Philip David Lang was born in Portland on December 16, 1929, to Henry Winfield Lang and Vera Margaret Lang (nee Kern). He was the youngest of five children, and attended the public schools in Portland, including Woodstock Grade School. He graduated from Franklin High School in southeast Portland in 1947 at 17, and then joined the United States Army Air Corps (now Air Force) where he served for three years. After deployment in Japan, he attended Lewis & Clark College in Portland, graduating with a bachelor's degree and a juris doctor. In 1952, he married Marcia J. Smith and had one son, Philip David. He later married Ginny, who he was married to for nearly 45 years.

== Career ==
After college and law school, Land became a trooper with the Oregon State Police before becoming an aide to Portland mayor Terry Schrunk. He then worked as an insurance executive before entering politics in 1960 as a Democrat when he was elected to the Oregon House of Representatives. He served there from 1961 to 1979, including a stint as speaker of the house from 1975 to 1978. During that time he helped add the office wings to the Oregon State Capitol, for which those offices that house the members of the house of representatives were named after Lang in 1997. He worked in insurance for 35 years.

== Later life and death ==
In 1998, Lang was appointed as chairman of the Oregon Liquor Control Commission (OLCC), and also served as chair of the National Alcohol Beverage Control Association starting in 2006. He left the OLCC in 2011.

Lang died on December 29, 2024, at the age of 95.

== See also ==
- List of Oregon Legislative Assemblies
