= Medford High School =

Medford High School may refer to:

- Medford High School (Massachusetts), Medford, Massachusetts
- Medford High School (Minnesota), Medford, Minnesota
- Medford Area Senior High School, Medford, Wisconsin
- North Medford High School, Medford, Oregon
- Old Medford High School, Medford, Massachusetts
- South Medford High School, Medford, Oregon
- Medford Opportunity High School, alternative HS in Medford, Oregon
