= Disappearance of Christie Farni =

1978 missing child case in Oregon, United States

Christie Farni
- Born: January 18, 1972; Los Angeles, California, U.S.
- Disappeared: December 14, 1978 (aged 6); Medford, Oregon, U.S.
- Status: Missing for 47 years, 7 months and 29 days
- Height: 3 ft 8 in (1.12 m)

Christie Lynn Farni (January 18, 1972 – disappeared December 14, 1978) is an American girl who went missing in Medford, Oregon, after testifying before a grand jury regarding abuse allegations against her biological father. Serial killer Henry Lee Lucas was implicated in her disappearance in 1983, but his alleged involvement was not confirmed. Her case is the oldest unsolved missing child case in Jackson County.

== Background ==
Christie Lynn Farni was born January 18, 1972, in Los Angeles, California. (Note: The Doe Network among other sources cite Farni's birthdate as January 18, 1972; this is corroborated in the California Birth Index, which shows Christie Lynn Farni was born in Los Angeles on this date.)

== Disappearance ==
Christie Lynn Farni, age six, testified before a grand jury against her father, Kenneth Farni, on December 14, 1978 regarding abuse allegations brought against him. After testifying, Farni returned to her foster home where she had been residing for only three days, before departing on foot to Jackson Elementary School. Farni was reported missing that afternoon after she failed to return home from school, and it was revealed that she had been absent from school that day. An alternate report in 1979 stated that Farni was seen playing with another young girl at the YMCA in Medford.

Both Farni's father and stepmother reportedly cooperated with law enforcement, and polygraph examinations were given to both. Farni's biological mother had died the year before her disappearance in a motorcycling accident.

== Alleged Henry Lee Lucas involvement ==
On December 16, 1983, it was reported that a remote area on the California-Oregon border was being searched, potentially for Farni's remains. Serial killer Henry Lee Lucas, a drifter, alluded to having abducted and murdered Farni, but the locations indicated by Lucas where her remains could allegedly be found proved fruitless. At the time, Lucas had claimed to have murdered as many as 165 people in the United States, mainly women, beginning at the age of thirteen.

== Subsequent developments ==
Farni's half-brother, who lived with her and her father during the time she disappeared, committed suicide at an undisclosed date. In 1994, Kenneth Farni died in a traffic collision. In 2008, the Medford Police reopened Farni's case, which is the oldest missing child case in Jackson County.

== See also ==
- Henry Lee Lucas
- List of people who disappeared
