= Cornelius C. Beekman House =

Historic structure in Jacksonville, Oregon, United States

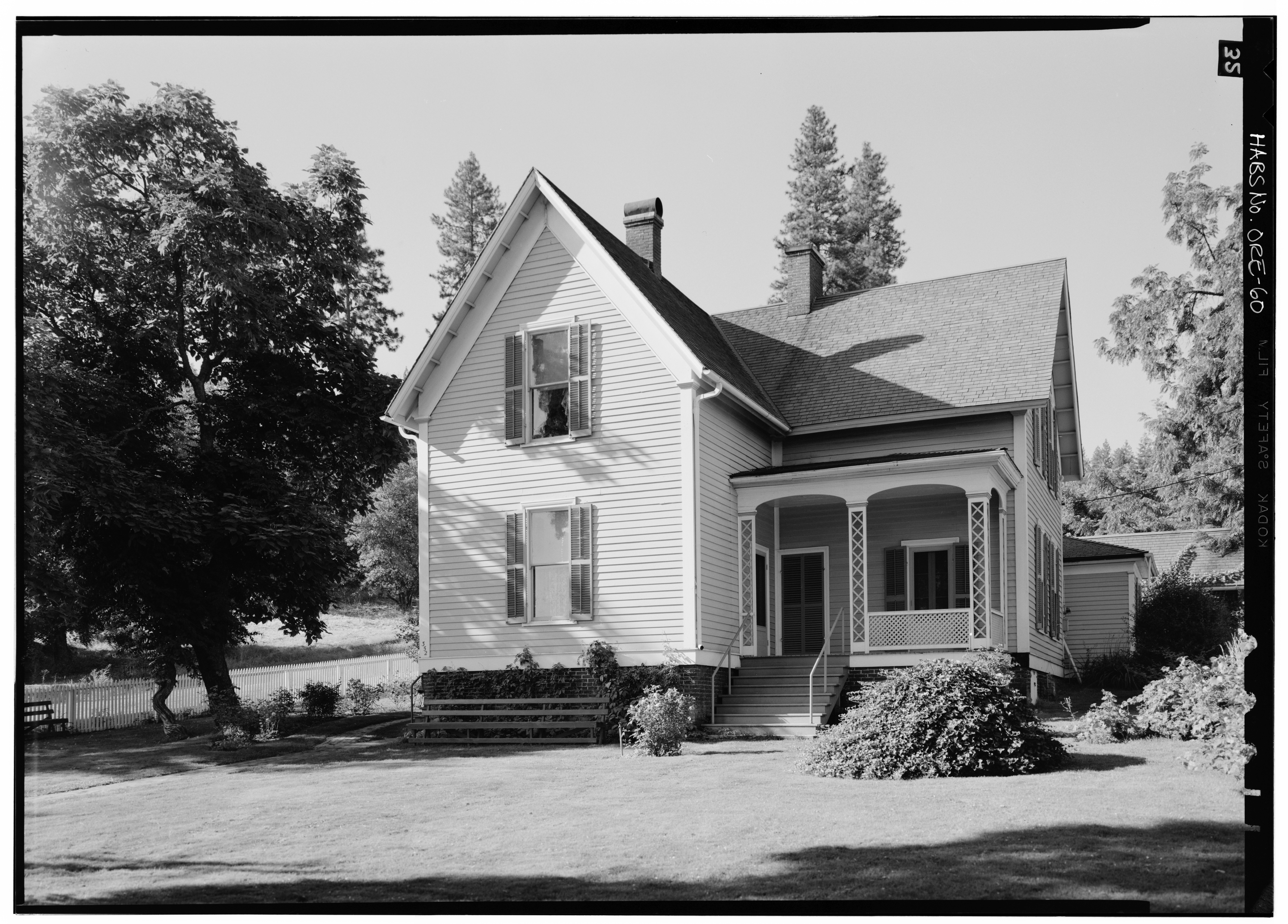
- The Beekman House in 1971
- Interactive map of the Cornelius C. Beekman House area

General information
- Architectural style: Carpenter Gothic
- Location: 470 East California Street, Jacksonville, Oregon, United States
- Coordinates: 42.312672°N 122.963760°W
- Named for: Cornelius C. Beekman
- Completed: 1873
- Owner: Jackson County

Technical details
- Floor count: 1-1/2

Website
- Beekman House

The Cornelius C. Beekman House is a historic structure in Jacksonville, Oregon, United States. The house was constructed between 1870 and 1876, and the Oregon Historic Preservation Office, part of the Oregon Parks and Recreation Department, places the year closer to 1873. Part of "millionaires' row" in the Jacksonville Historic District, the house was built by banker Cornelius C. Beekman as a residence for his wife and children, and the Beekman family were the only recorded occupants.

The house is a museum owned by the city of Jacksonville, Oregon, and offers meeting and event facilities.
