= Beekman Native Plant Arboretum =

Arboretum in Jacksonville, Oregon, United States

- Interactive map of Beekman Native Plant Arboretum
- Type: Arboretum
- Location: Jacksonville, Oregon, United States
- Coordinates: 42°18′45″N 122°57′50″W
- Area: 3-acre (1.2 ha)
- Opened: 1989
- Species: 175+
- Website: Official website

The Beekman Native Plant Arboretum is a three-acre (12,000 m^{2}) arboretum in Jackson County, Oregon, United States, that features trees, shrubs and herbs from eight zones of the Siskiyou and Cascade mountains in Southern Oregon. It is located behind the historic Beekman House at 352 East California Street in Jacksonville and is named for Jacksonville pioneer Cornelius C. Beekman.

The Arboretum contains more than 175 species from the high deserts of Eastern Oregon, high-altitude subalpine slopes around Crater Lake, and serpentine soils of the Siskiyou Mountains. It features species from the chaparral, low-elevation forest and riparian zones, including grassland plants, lodgepole pine and sagebrush, buckwheat, penstemon and balsam root, and a bog with skunk cabbage and wild ginger. Most plants are labeled with name and habitat. Two footbridges cross a seasonal stream.

The arboretum was designed by Alan Horobin, in collaboration with the Jacksonville Woodlands Association, organized in 1989 to preserve the woodlands behind the Beekman House.

In March, 2000, John and Joyce Jackson, of Kingwood, Texas, concluded their nationwide project to plant trees in each state at a location containing the name of Jackson by planting five trees at the arboretum. The occasion of planting in their 50th state was marked with a ceremony hosted by the chamber of commerce and attended by many in the community.

== See also ==
- List of botanical gardens in the United States
