= North Medford =

North Medford is the name of some places in the United States of America:

- A neighborhood in Medford, Massachusetts
- A neighborhood in Medford, Oregon
  - North Medford High School
