= Jackson County Courthouse (Medford, Oregon) =

- U.S. National Register of Historic Places
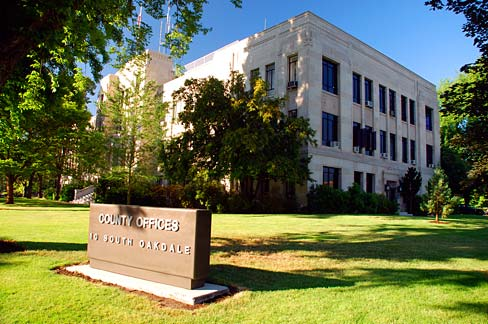
- The courthouse in 2008

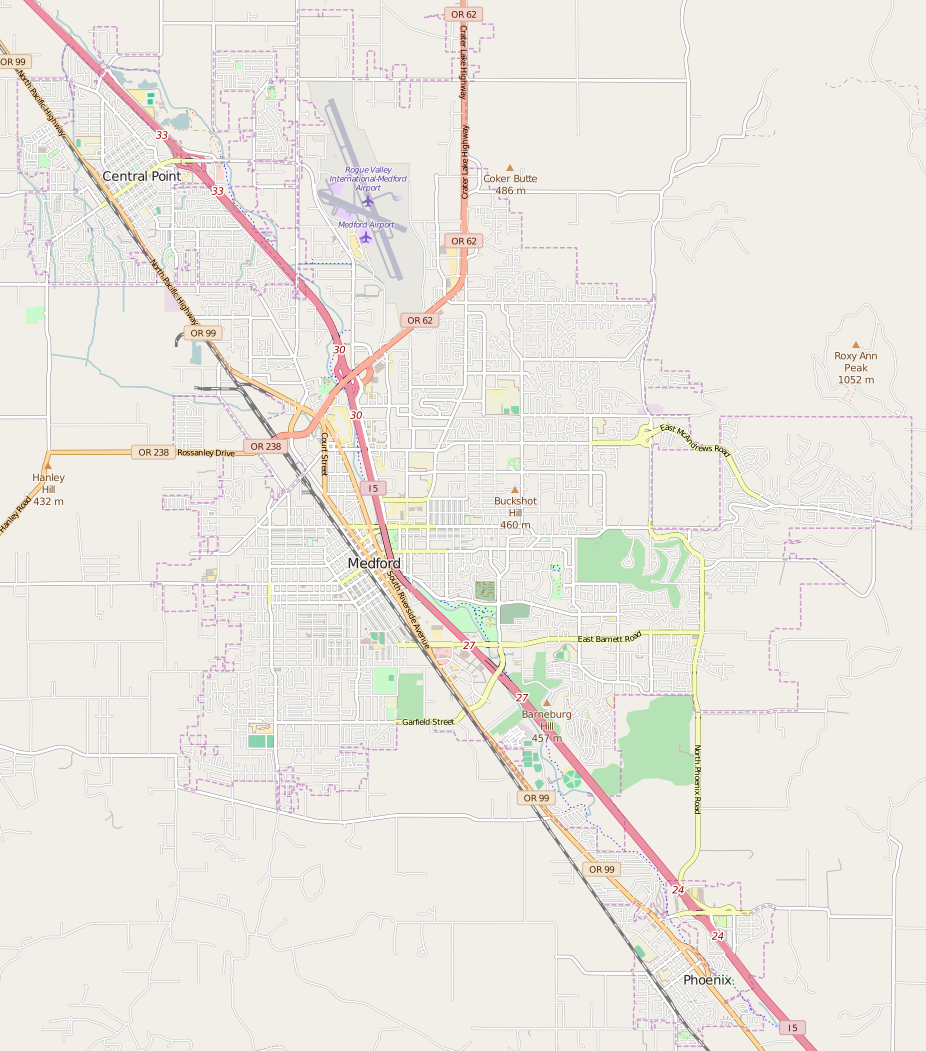
- Location within Medford OR Location within Oregon
- Location: 10 S. Oakdale Avenue; Medford, Oregon
- Coordinates: 42°19′23″N 122°52′40″W
- Built: 1932
- Architect: J. G. Link, Inc.
- Architectural style: Art Deco
- NRHP reference No.: 86002921
- Added to NRHP: October 23, 1986

Jackson County Courthouse is an Art Deco building in Medford, Oregon, United States. It was built in 1932, six years after county residents voted to move the county seat from Jacksonville to Medford.

The former Jackson County Courthouse, built in Jacksonville in 1883, once served as the Southern Oregon Historical Society Museum. It is a contributing property of the Jacksonville Historic District.

== See also ==
- National Register of Historic Places listings in Jackson County, Oregon
