= Chrest =

Chrest is a surname. Notable people with the name include:

- Jim Chrest (1938–2015), American politician
- Joe Chrest (born 1965), American actor
- Rick Chrest, Canadian politician

== See also ==
- CHREST
