= Jackson County Courthouse (Jacksonville, Oregon) =

- U.S. Historic district – Contributing property
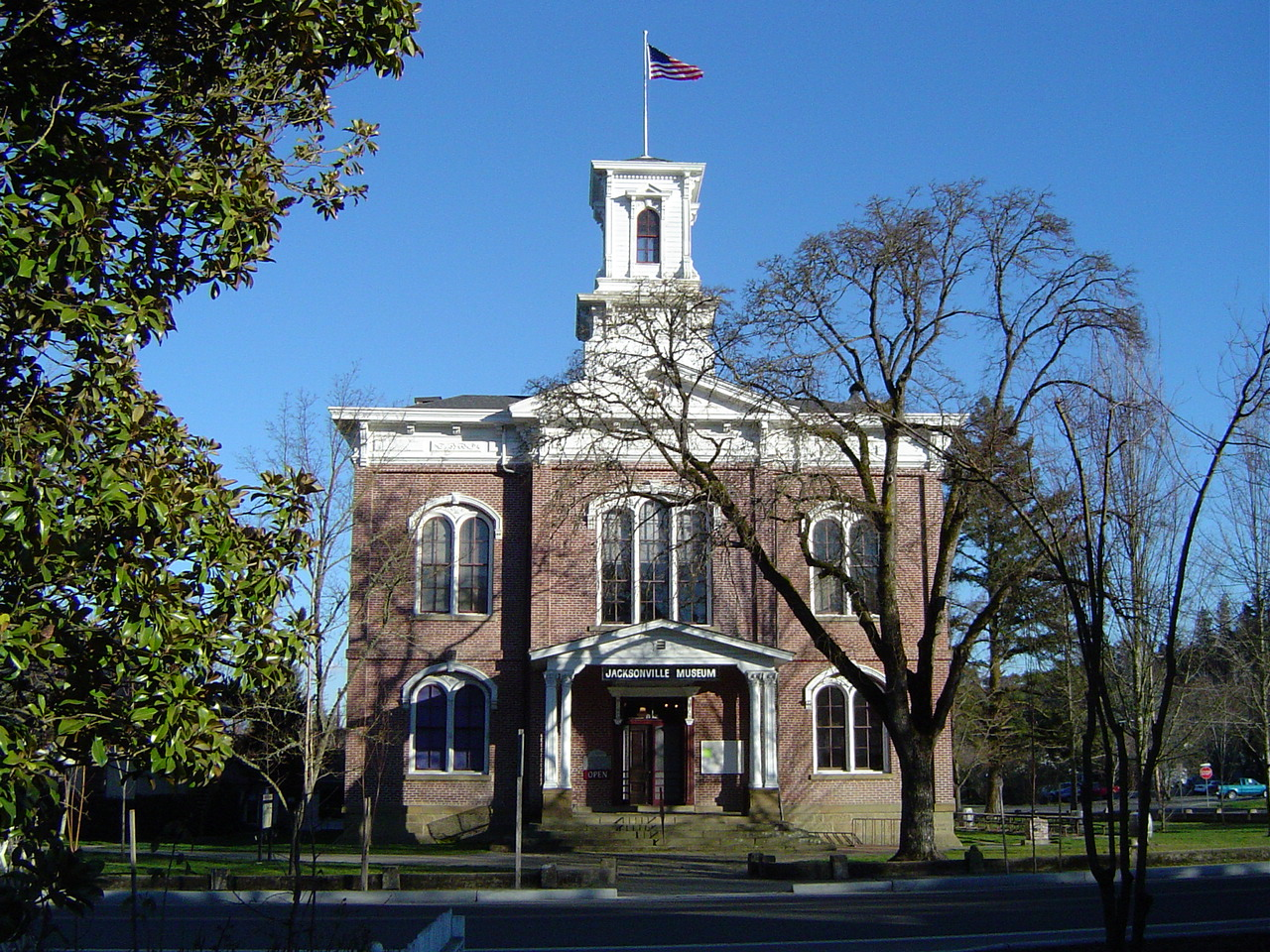
- Former Jackson County courthouse, in Jacksonville

- Location within Oregon Location within the United States
- Interactive map showing the location of Jackson County Courthouse
- Location: Jacksonville, Oregon
- Coordinates: 42°18′52″N 122°57′56″W
- Part of: Jacksonville Historic District (ID66000950)
- Added to NRHP: November 13, 1966

The Jackson County Courthouse is a former county courthouse in Jacksonville, Oregon, United States, built in 1883. The courthouse is a contributing property of the Jacksonville Historic District, which is listed on the National Register of Historic Places (NRHP). It was formerly the Jacksonville Museum owned by Jackson County and operated by the Southern Oregon Historical Society (SOHS), which also managed several other historic properties in Jacksonville. The museum in the courthouse closed in 2006 because of lack of funding. Ownership of the historic courthouse was transferred to the City of Jacksonville in 2012. The SOHS still operates Hanley Farm in Central Point and a research library in Medford.

The current Jackson County Courthouse, also listed on the NRHP, is in Medford, where the county seat was moved in 1926.
