= Eugene Bennett =

Eugene Bennett may refer to:

- Eugene Bennett (artist) (1921–2010), American visual artist
- Eugene Paul Bennett (1892–1970), British soldier and Victoria Cross recipient

== See also ==
- Eugene Bennett Fluckey (1913–2007), United States Navy submarine commander and Medal of Honor recipient
