= Albert H. Densmore =

American politician

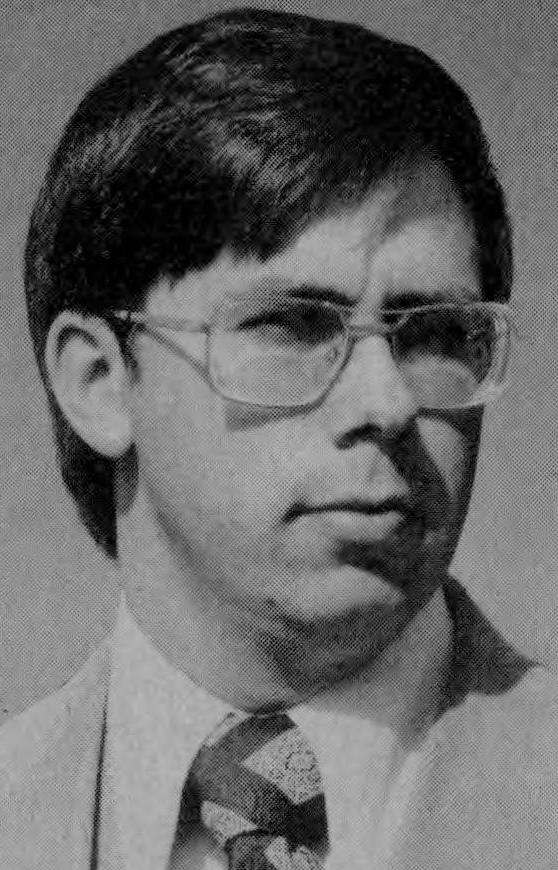
- State represtative Al Densmore, 1976

Member of the Oregon House of Representatives from the 19th and 50th district
- In office 1971–1976
- Preceded by: Robert G. Davis (District 19)
- Succeeded by: Clayton C. Klein, Jr. (District 50)
- Constituency: Jackson County

Personal details
- Born: September 9, 1946 (age 80) Portland, Oregon
- Party: Democrat; later Republican
- Profession: Educator and businessman

Albert Harry Densmore (born September 9, 1946), also known as Al Densmore, is an American politician and businessman from Medford, Oregon. He served three terms as a Democrat in the Oregon House of Representatives. During his last term, he was speaker pro tempore in the House of Representatives. After leaving the legislature, Densmore was elected mayor of Medford and later served on the Medford city council.

== Early life ==
Densmore was born in Portland, Oregon, on September 9, 1946, the son of Harry Darwin and Eathel Pinkey Densmore. He grew up in the Portland area and attended Reynolds High School, graduating in 1964. Densmore went on to attend Portland State University, where he graduated in 1968 with a bachelor's degree in political science.

Densmore started teaching at Medford Senior High School in 1968. After arriving in Medford, he began working on a master's degree in secondary education at Southern Oregon University, receiving that degree in 1974. During this time, he also served as an officer in the United States Army Reserve.

== State legislature ==
In 1970, Densmore ran for the District 19 seat in the Oregon House of Representatives as a Democrat. At that time, District 19 represented Jackson County in southern Oregon. This included the city of Medford. He won the Democratic nomination and then the general election. Densmore was 24 years old when he took his seat in the Oregon House on 11 January 1971. He served through the regular legislative session which ended on 10 June. During the session, Densmore was a member of the House elections and reapportionment committee and the state and federal affairs committee.

Densmore ran for re-election in 1972. The state had realigned House districts so he ran in District 50 which represented the Medford area. Once again, he won the primary and then the general election. This allowed him to serve in the regular legislative session which opened on 8 January 1973 and lasted through 6 July. During that session, the Democrats held the majority in the House and Densmore was elected majority whip by his Democratic peers. He also served as chairman of the elections committee and was a member of the rules, human resources, government and urban affairs, and legislative administration committees. Densmore also attended a special session in early 1974. That session began on 24 January and lasted through 24 February.

Densmore ran for a third term in 1974 and was re-elected. The regular legislative session began on 13 January 1975. In that session, his House peers elected him speaker pro tempore. Densmore also continued serving as chairman of the elections committee. In addition, he was a member of the rules, state and federal affairs, human resources, intergovernmental affairs, and legislative administration committees. The regular session ended on 14 June. However, the legislature was called back for a one-day special session on 16 September 1975. Densmore attended that session as well.

When he was not serving in the legislature, Densmore continued to teach at Medford High School. He was also active in a wide range of civic and fraternal organizations including the Southern Oregon Historical Society, Oregon Council for Senior Citizens, Oregon Law Enforcement Council, the Kiwanis, and the local Grange.

== Business and local politics ==
Instead of running for re-election to the state House of Representatives in 1976, Densmore decide to run for the Oregon Secretary of State position. However, he was beaten in the Democratic primary. Because he lost in the primary, Densmore was able to run for the non-partisan position of Medford mayor in the general election that same year. He was elected Medford's mayor in the general election, defeating the incumbent mayor. Densmore held the mayor position for the next six years.

In 1978, Densmore left his teaching job and started a new career as an insurance agent. While he continued to sell insurance, he also became a chartered life underwriter in 1983 and a chartered financial consultant in 1985. Densmore was later elected president of the Rogue Association of Insurance and Financial Advisors. During this time, Densmore was also elected chairman of the board for the Southern Oregon Education Service District. He stayed on that board for the next 16 years.

In 1989, Densmore left the Democratic Party and registered as a Republican. Densmore's decision to change parties was the result of his belief that the Republican Party was more responsive to the needs of small-business and better prepared to manage the overall economy. Seven years later, he attempted to win another term in the state legislature, representing District 50. This time, he ran as a Republican. However, he lost the 1996 primary to the Republican incumbent, John Watt.

In 2006, Densmore decided to run for a seat on the Medford city council. He was elected and took his seat in early 2007. He was re-elected in 2010. Densmore remained on the council until he resigned in 2013. During his tenure on the council, Densmore championed a number of city transportation projects. From 2007 to 2010, he also served on the board of directors for the Southern Oregon Regional Economic Development Corporation. In addition, he was a member of the Medford Urban Renewal Agency board, a member of the Bear Creek Valley Rotary Club, and served as president of the Bear Creek Greenway Foundation.

In 2015, after 36 years as an insurance and financial consultant, Densmore took a new job with a Medford area lobbying firm. He is currently the firm's resident transportation and economic development expert.

== Personal life ==
In 1974, Densmore married to Susan Ogle of Lakeview, Oregon. After his first marriage ended, he married Sally Hunt in 1992. Densmore has two daughters, Brooke Densmore Williams and Megan Densmore. He also has two step-sons, Ed and Joe Carson. He also has a grandson named Gray Carson, and granddaughter Kelly Carson.
