= Eugene Bennett (artist) =

American artist (1921–2010)

- Born: December 20, 1921; Central Point, Oregon
- Died: November 2, 2010 (aged 88); Jacksonville, Oregon
- Education: University of Oregon, Art Institute of Chicago
- Known for: Painting, Collage, Photography
- Awards: Oregon Governor's Arts Award, 2002

Eugene Peart Bennett (December 20, 1921 – November 2, 2010) was an American artist born in Central Point, Oregon. Although he was known for florals and landscapes in oils and watercolors, Bennett also worked in wood construction, photography and collage.

== Biography ==
Bennett spent his childhood in Medford, Oregon, the youngest of four children in a musical family. He played the piano and pump organ by ear, and took violin lessons. At the University of Oregon, Bennett studied music, but he also painted in his free time. During Bennett's service in the Navy, from 1943 to 1946, he continued to paint, and he decided to attend the Art Institute of Chicago. By 1954 he had received his bachelor's and master's degrees from the Art Institute, and he taught there, and at New Trier High School. In 1954 Bennett moved to Italy and traveled to France. When he returned to Chicago in 1955, his works were shown in various exhibitions, and in 1957 the Art Institute awarded him the Renaissance Prize for Cathedral Forms. Although he was successful in Chicago, Bennett decided to return to Oregon. He was quoted in Southern Oregon Heritage Today as saying that he returned not only because the Rogue Valley was home, and beautiful, but also because he knew "there were many enthusiastic and talented artists in the Rogue Valley with so few possibilities to study or show their work. I wanted to help provide that opportunity for them." Bennett taught classes in a home he had designed and built on South Grape Street in Medford, and in 1959 he established the Rogue Valley Art Association, which opened the Rogue Gallery.

Bennett's last move was to Jacksonville, Oregon. He purchased the Eagle Brewery Saloon in 1962 and converted it to his home and studio, where he continued to paint, sculpt, build, draw and create collages. He particularly enjoyed working with wood and images of wood. Stacks of lumber and other building materials figure prominently in his work, and he created an installation of intricately carved poles studded with nails for the Oregon Pavilion at the Seattle World's Fair in 1962.

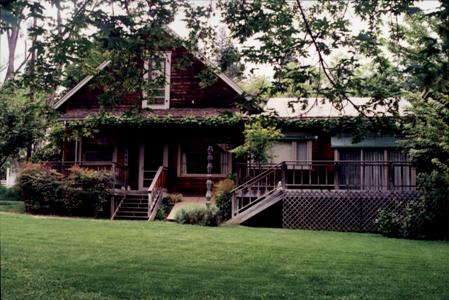
Bennett's Jacksonville home

In the mid-90s Bennett developed benign essential blepharospasm, which hindered his ability to keep his eyelids open and to tolerate light. Nevertheless, he continued to work, but at a somewhat reduced pace, concentrating increasingly on small collages and assemblages of wood, tacks, nails, foil, and found objects.

Bennett employed his multiple talents, music, art and teaching, to benefit his community. He served on the Jacksonville Planning Commission and supported the Britt Festival by hosting rehearsals and providing art work for Britt Festival posters.

Bennett died after struggling with complications from pneumonia.
