= JCSD =

JCSD may refer to:

- Jackson County School District (disambiguation)
- Janesville Consolidated School District
- Johnston Community School District
