= South Medford High School =

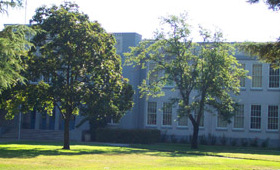
- The original South Medford High School campus, now Oakdale middle school

Location
- 1551 Cunningham Ave; Medford, Oregon 97501; United States; 42°18′18″N 122°53′33″W

Information
- Type: Public
- School district: Medford School District
- Principal: Jonathan Lyons
- Teaching staff: 76.89 (FTE)
- Grades: 9–12
- Enrollment: 1,945 (2023–2024)
- Student to teacher ratio: 25.30
- Colors: Royal blue, black and gray
- Athletics conference: OSAA Southwest Conference 6A-6
- Nickname: Panthers
- Rival: North Medford High School
- Website: Official website

South Medford High School is a public high school in Medford, Oregon, United States.

== History ==
The South Medford campus was originally built in 1931 as Medford High School. Then in the 1960s, the school was divided between two campuses. Medford High became Medford Mid High, serving grades 9 and 10, with grades 11 and 12 going to a newly constructed campus, known as Medford Senior High, which is the current North Medford High School campus. This system was primarily used to allow Medford's football team to compete against schools in large cities such as Portland.

The Panther mascot and school colors were chosen by a 1985 vote of the students in the 549-C school district. Panthers won out over Cyclones and Lions among other choices. The school colors were originally "Blue and Silver-Grey".

The campus was also home to Spiegelberg Stadium (9,250 seat capacity). Both South Medford and North Medford High School share the stadium for football.

In 2004, FieldTurf, a state-of-the-art surface commonly used on professional and college fields, was installed, and the surrounding track was resurfaced. The $700,000 privately funded project was spearheaded by Ed Singler, president of the Linebackers Club.

In 2010 the campus (referred to as "Old South Medford High School") became home to Central Medford High School.

In 2020, Central High moved to new location making way for Oakdale Middle School.

== Small School Initiative ==
In 2004–2005 school year, the Bill and Melinda Gates Foundation selected South Medford High as part of their Small School Initiative program. Over the course of the next three years, the staff of South Medford toured various other high schools across the nation to determine the exact manner in which to implement the program. Starting in the 2006–2007 school year, South Medford began the SSI with the "Freshman Academy." The following year adding the small schools "BACH" (Bridging the Arts, Communications and Humanities), "CHAMPS" (Community Health and Medical Professions School), and The Discovery School.

== Academics ==
In the 2008–09 school year, 81% of the school's seniors received their high school diploma. Of 441 students, 355 graduated, 44 dropped out, and 42 stayed in high school.

In the 2009–10 school year, 78% of South's Seniors received a diploma. Of 470 students, 374 graduated, 96 dropped out, and 7 stayed in high school.

Average Test Score per School Year
| | 09-10 | 10-11 | 11-12 | 12-13 | 13-14 | 14-15 | 15-16 | 16-17 |
| Math | 55% | 72% | | | | | | |
| Writing | 56% | 76% | | | | | | |
| Reading | 82% | 88% | | | | | | |
| Science | 66% | 81% | | | | | | |

South Medford High School offers 15 Advanced Placement (AP) courses and opportunities for college credit through Rogue Community College and Southern Oregon University.

== Athletics ==
The South Medford Panthers participate in Oregon's 6A Southwest Conference.

=== State championships ===
- Boys Soccer: 1997, 2003
- Boys Basketball: 2007
- Girls Basketball: 2012, 2024
- Cheerleading: 1987

== Notable alumni ==
- Jeff Barry, former pro baseball player, selected in 4th round of 1990 MLB draft
- Steve Bechler, baseball player
- Bill Bowerman, co-founder of Nike, Inc. and University of Oregon track coach
- Dick Fosbury, athlete in high jump, inventor of Fosbury Flop, two-time NCAA champion, 1968 Summer Olympics gold medalist
- Les Gutches, wrestler, NCAA champion, 1997 world champion, 1999 Pan-Am Games gold medalist, member of U.S. team in 1996 Atlanta Olympics
- Jacob Melton, baseball player, selected in the 2nd round of 2022 MLB draft
- E. J. Singler, basketball player, current free agent
- Kyle Singler, basketball player for Liga's ACB Monbus Obradoiro, 2010 NCAA champion with Duke
- Jonathan Stark, tennis player, 1994 French Open men's doubles champion and 1995 Wimbledon mixed doubles champion
- Justin Baldoni, actor and director
