= Cornelius C. Beekman =

Banker from the United States of America

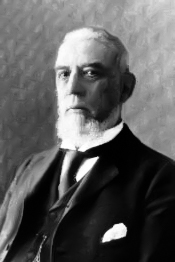
- Cornelius Beekman around the turn of the 20th century
- Born: January 27, 1828; Dundee, New York, US
- Died: February 22, 1915 (aged 87); Jacksonville, Oregon, US
- Resting place: Jacksonville Cemetery; 42.317534°N 122.971998°W
- Other names: Beek; Uncle Beek
- Occupations: Wells-Fargo Express agent Banker
- Known for: Cornelius C. Beekman House; Beekman Bank; Beekman Native Plant Arboretum
- Spouse: Julia E. Hoffman
- Children: Benjamin B. Beekman; Carrie C. Beekman; Lydia Beekman

Cornelius C. Beekman (January 27, 1828 – February 22, 1915) was a Wells-Fargo Express agent and banker in Jacksonville, Oregon, United States. He is the namesake of the Cornelius C. Beekman House and the Beekman Native Plant Arboretum.

== Early life ==
Beekman was born in 1828 in Dundee, New York, to parents Benjamin Beekman and Lydia Compton. The elder Beekman trained his son to be a carpenter. Beekman attended public school in Yates County and remained in the area until 1850. In that year, he sailed for San Francisco intent on becoming a gold prospector during the California Gold Rush. Believing that all of the good claims already had been filed, Beekman remained in San Francisco and worked briefly as a carpenter at the rate of one ounce of gold per day. In 1851, he traveled north and staked a claim in Yreka.

== Career ==
In 1853, Beekman became a delivery rider for Cram, Rogers & Co., and he rode a trail through the Siskiyou Mountains two or three times a week carrying gold dust, letters, and parcels between Yreka, California, and Jacksonville, Oregon. He relocated to Jacksonville in that year, and when Cram Rogers failed in 1856, he opened the Beekman Express Company and continued along the same route.

For a time, Beekman was paid five percent of the estimated value of the gold dust he transported, and the gold dust amounted to more than $15,000,000 over the duration of his service. Beekman also received one dollar for each letter and newspaper he transported. In 1857, he opened the Beekman Bank in Jacksonville. The bank became the first bank in Southern Oregon, and because depositors dealt in gold dust, Beekman charged a storage fee of one percent rather than pay interest on deposits. He continued in banking until shortly before his death in 1915.

In 1863, Beekman became the Jacksonville agent of the Wells Fargo Express Co., a post he held for forty years. During the time he worked for Wells Fargo, Beekman shipped millions of dollars in gold dust to be minted in San Francisco.

Beekman ran on the Republican ticket for governor of Oregon in 1878, losing to William Thayer by fewer than 70 votes. Beekman was a 32nd degree Mason and a member of the Sons of the American Revolution.

== Popular culture ==
In 2018, Wells Fargo Bank created a television ad which mentions Cornelius Beekman. It mentions a Wells Fargo stage coach being robbed and the thieves being deceived by Beekman into stealing rocks. There is an explanation for how this deception worked. The robbers expected the express agents to use the strong box for gold. Instead, Beekman repacked gold into the smaller wooden boxes that had held candles.

== Philanthropy ==
Beekman served as a regent of the University of Oregon, and with Henry Failing he established there the Failing-Beekman Prize in 1880 for best oration at the time of graduation.

Beekman helped to found the First Presbyterian Church of Jacksonville. He helped to establish the community of Medford, Oregon as one of the four property owners of the original town site.

Party political offices
Preceded by J. C. Tolman	Republican nominee for Governor of Oregon; 1878	Succeeded by Zenas Ferry Moody
