= Peter Britt =

American photographer (1819–1905)

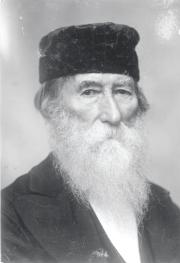
- Born: March 12, 1819; Obstalden, Glarus, Switzerland
- Died: October 3, 1905 (aged 86); Jacksonville, Oregon
- Occupations: Photographer, painter, orchardist

Peter Britt (12 March 1819 – 3 October 1905) was a Swiss portrait painter and American pioneer photographer, meteorologist, accomplished horticulturist, an early settler and developer in the Rogue Valley of the Oregon Territory. Britt is considered as one of the Pacific Northwest's most celebrated photographers, as well as the "father of the grape industry" in Southern Oregon. His photos of Crater Lake were instrumental in creation of the Crater Lake National Park in 1902.

== Biography ==
When Peter Britt was born in the town of Obstalden in the Swiss canton of Glarus, his family farmed land that had been in the family for centuries. Earning a living there as an itinerant portrait artist was difficult, but Peter pursued this until 1845, when he immigrated to the United States with his father Jacob Kaspar Britt, his brother Kaspar, and Kaspar's family. They settled with other Swiss emigres in Highland, Illinois. Portrait artists of the time were faced with competition from daguerreotype photographers, so Britt studied this new technology with John H. Fitzgibbon in St. Louis. Although Britt apparently opened his own studio in Highland in 1847 and operated it for five years, however no records to support that claim were ever located.

Perhaps gold fever, or just wanderlust, took Peter Britt from Illinois to Oregon in 1852, following the completion of his naturalization process. Britt left Illinois with John Hug and two other Swiss men heading west on the Oregon Trail. Britt was elected captain of the wagon train, John was the wagon master, and the group made it to Grande Ronde Valley before the men insisted on no longer dealing with Britt's 300 pounds of photographic equipment. John Hug split the wagon train into two halves. At The Dalles, Oregon, John Hug and Britt chose an overland route to Portland, while the other two men chose the Columbia River route and arrived in Portland, Oregon, just 24 hours later. Finally, Britt, hearing news of the gold mining strike in Table Rock City (now Jacksonville, Oregon), left Portland alone for southern Oregon. According to Alan Clark Miller, he arrived to the gold-mining camp of Jacksonville with the two-wheeled cart, a yoke of oxen, a mule, and five dollars in his pocket.

Britt built a log cabin in Jacksonville in November 1852, on land where he lived for the rest of his life. This log cabin no longer exists, but Southern Oregon University archeologists have recently determined the site of the cabin.

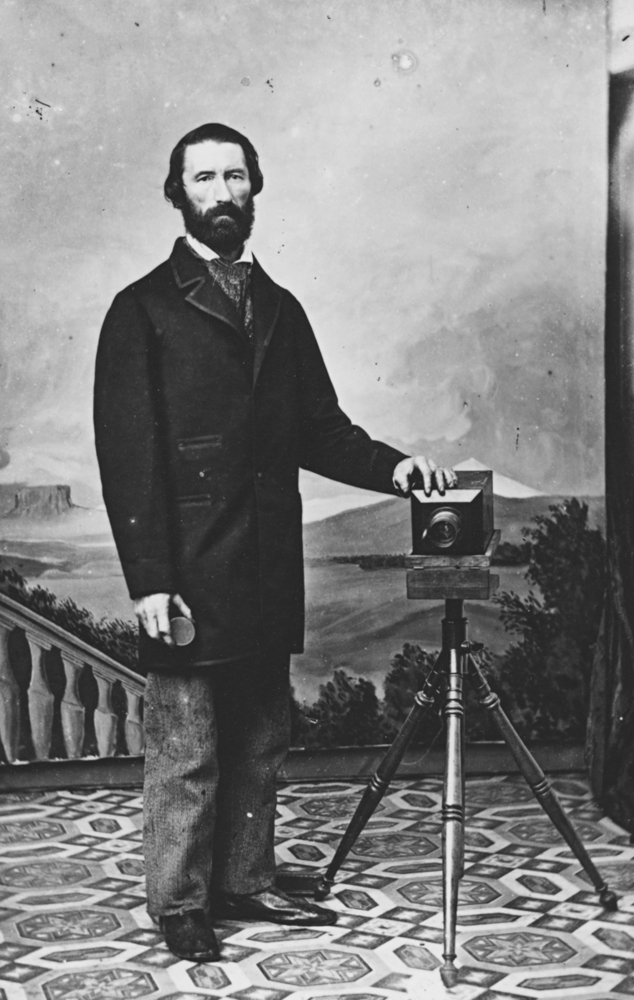
Peter Britt, self-portrait, 1860s

Although Peter Britt brought his photographic equipment all the way from Illinois to Oregon for a photo studio, he first tried gold mining and mule packing in order to earn a living. Altogether, Britt was successful enough to send money back to his brother Kaspar in Illinois, build a frame house in 1854, give up the dangerous mule packing business in 1856 to concentrate on his photography business, and expand his home in 1859.

According to Alan Clark Miller, Britt knew his future wife, Amalia Grob, in Switzerland, but her father would not allow them to marry because Peter Britt's occupation as an itinerant artist was too tenuous. Instead, Amalia married a relative, Kaspar Grob. Britt's brother Kaspar did marry Amalia's sister, though. When Mr. Grob died in 1861, Kaspar Britt contacted Peter. Miller states that Peter immediately sent Amalia funds to return to Switzerland if she wished, or to travel to Oregon and marry him. With her young son Jacob, Amalia traveled to New Orleans and around Cape Horn to San Francisco, then by steamer to Crescent City and finally by stage to the Applegate stop. Peter Britt met her there and they were married.

Prior to Amalia's death in 1871, she and Peter had three children of their own, Emil, Arnold (who died as an infant) and Amalia Dorothea, known as Mollie. Emil, who also became a photographer, and Mollie remained in the Britt home their entire lives.

== Photography ==
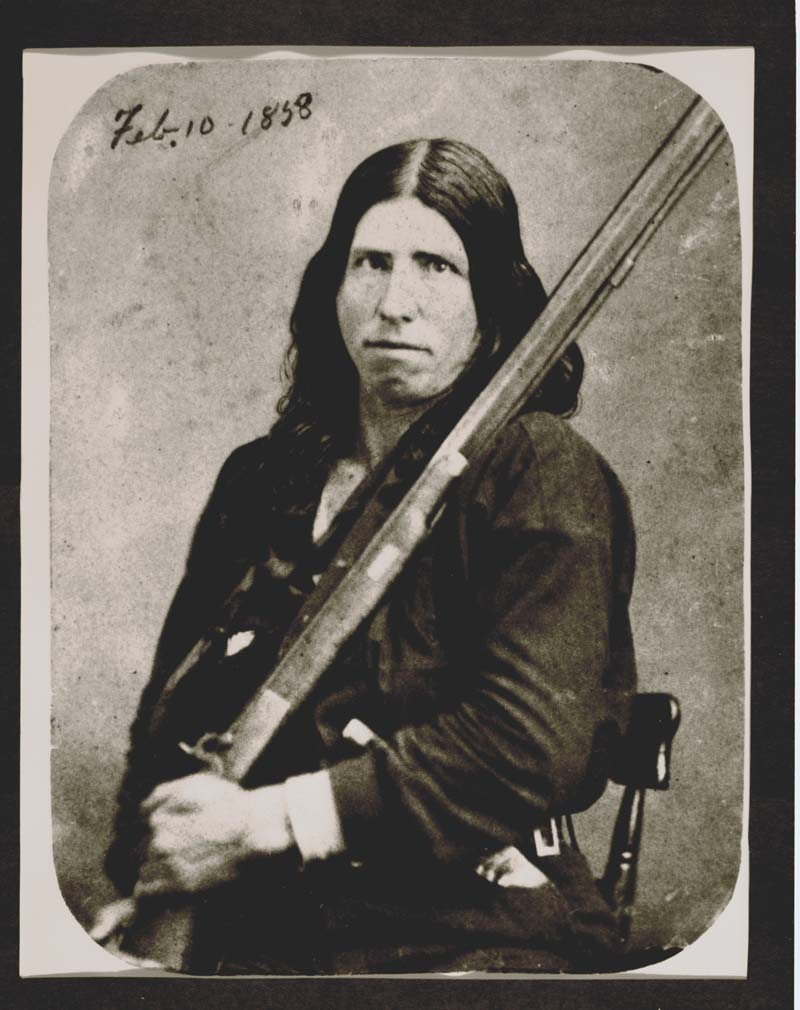
Britt's first wet plate negative, 7 February 1858

In 1856, Britt decided to pursue photographic trade as the main line in business and opened a photography studio, P. Britt’s Photograph and Daguerreotype Room, in Jacksonville. Soon, he established himself in the southwestern Oregon and northern California area as a skillful professional, best known for his photo portraits. Among his subjects were local prominent citizens, farmers, miners, Chinese workers, and Native Americans.

Until 1858 Britt could take only daguerreotypes or ambrotypes, processes that provided only the photo, no negatives or extra prints. About 200 of his daguerreotypes survive. Britt's first wet plate negative was taken of a trapper who agreed to sit for Britt's experiment.

In the 1860s Britt purchased a stereo camera, which led to his development as an outdoor photographer as well as a gallery photographer. At this point he set up the traveling studio he called The Pain, a pun on Bain Wagon Company, which manufactured his wagon. Although Britt traveled only within 100 miles (160 km) of Jacksonville, this provided opportunities to photograph the Oregon Coast, the Redwood Empire, the Siskiyou Mountains, the Rogue and Klamath rivers, and the deserts and lava beds east of the Cascades.

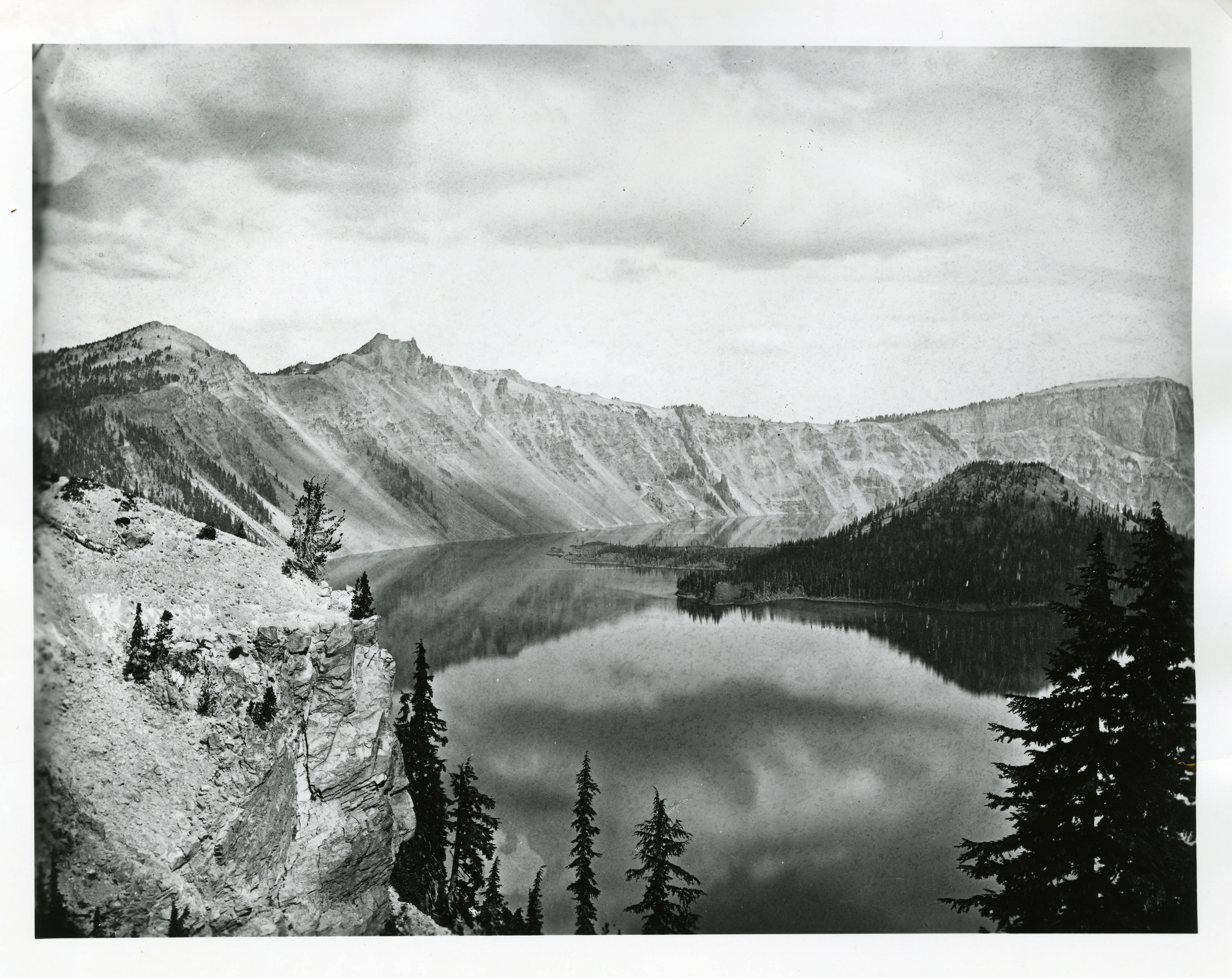
Crater Lake by Peter Britt, 1874

Peter Britt is often remembered as the person who took the first successful photograph of Crater Lake. He did so in 1874, after his attempts in 1868 and 1869 had failed. His photos helped William Gladstone Steel persuade Congress to create Crater Lake National Park in 1902. Britt also painted Crater Lake.

Many of Peter Britt's dry plate negatives, and those of his son Emil, are archived at the Southern Oregon Historical Society Research Library in Medford, Oregon. They are owned by Southern Oregon University. Images of many Britt prints may be viewed online.

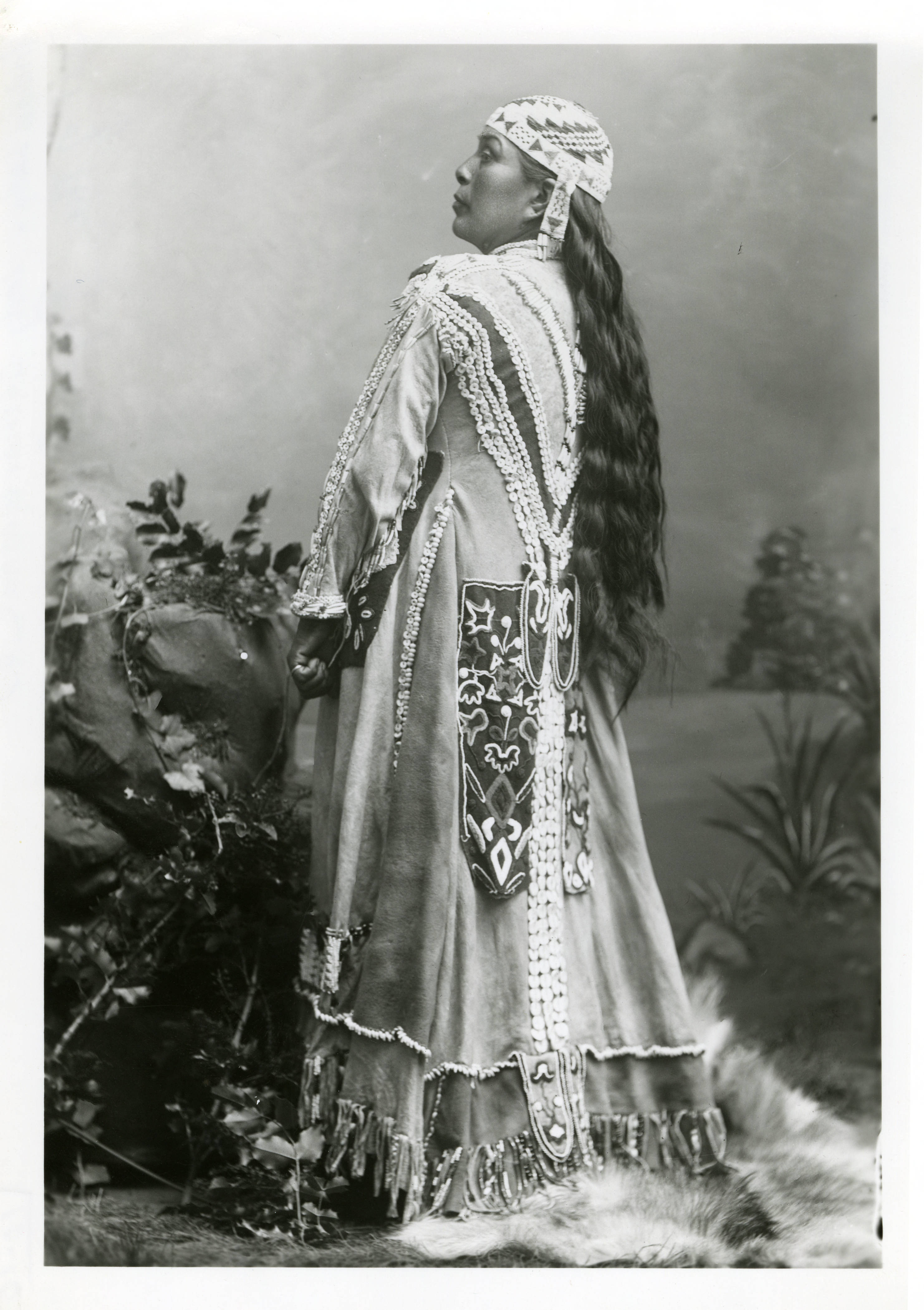
Jennie, a Rogue River Native American woman, who crafted the dress worn in this iconic Peter Britt portrait

== Painting ==
Peter Britt began his career as an artist in Switzerland. Although he may have been primarily interested in painting nature studies and landscapes, he earned an income by painting portraits in Switzerland, Germany and possibly France. Once in the United States, Britt also painted portraits on commission, including one of Col. George Davenport completed just before Davenport was murdered by river pirates on July 4, 1845. This portrait, considered as "the foremost example of Peter Britt's portrait skill", now belongs to the Figge Art Museum.

Since paints and canvases were difficult to obtain due to the lack of funds, Britt apparently ground minerals and mixed them with oil and pigments, and wove his own canvases from flax grown on the family farm.

Britt returned to painting in his later years. He painted remembered views of Switzerland, portraits of Britt family members and Oregon scenes such as Crater Lake and Mill Creek Falls.

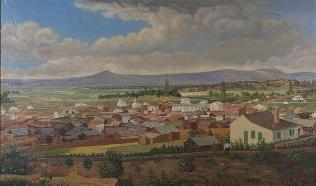
Painting of Jacksonville, Oregon by Britt

== Other pursuits ==
Long before he established Oregon's first winery, Valley View Vineyard, Peter Britt grew grapes and sold wine in Jacksonville. By 1880 he produced 1,000 to 3,000 US gallons (3.8 to 11.4 kl) of wine per year, and eventually filled orders from as far away as Wyoming. Britt also produced and sold honey, peaches, apples and pears.

Britt is known as the father of the southern Oregon fruit industry. He irrigated his property as early as 1855 and used smudging to fight frost. As an avid horticulturalist, Britt imported plants from "most of the civilized world." He particularly enjoyed growing semi-tropical plants, including palm trees, an Abyssinian banana tree, Smyrna figs and Japanese persimmons. The plants, unsuited to southern Oregon's climate, required exceptional care and in some cases a solarium. In September 1903, Professor A. B. Cordley and Professor E. R. Lake, of the Oregon Agricultural College at Corvallis, while in Jacksonville for the fruit-growers convention paid a visit to Britt's home and examined the park about the house and his collection of trees, shrubs, and flowers.

In addition to obtaining land for his orchards, gardens and vineyard, Britt invested in land farmed by tenant farmers, and held deeds to over 2,000 acres (8.1 km^{2}). Britt also made money by making loans secured by land, and unsecured personal loans. Miller indicates Britt was a reasonable, perhaps even generous, landlord and lender. Britt also dealt fairly with Chinese miners, lending them grubstakes until he finally hung a sign "No More Money to Loan", but still provided shacks on his property to Chinese laborers who mined gold on his land.

Britt and later his son Emil devoted significant time to at least one endeavor, weather reporting, that netted no income. Notes in Britt's diary began in 1859, when he used a pocket sundial and a homemade rain gauge. From 1870 to 1891, Britt reported weather to the Signal Corps Weather Service, using their equipment. Emil Britt reported to the Weather Bureau for another 58 years.

== Civic duties ==
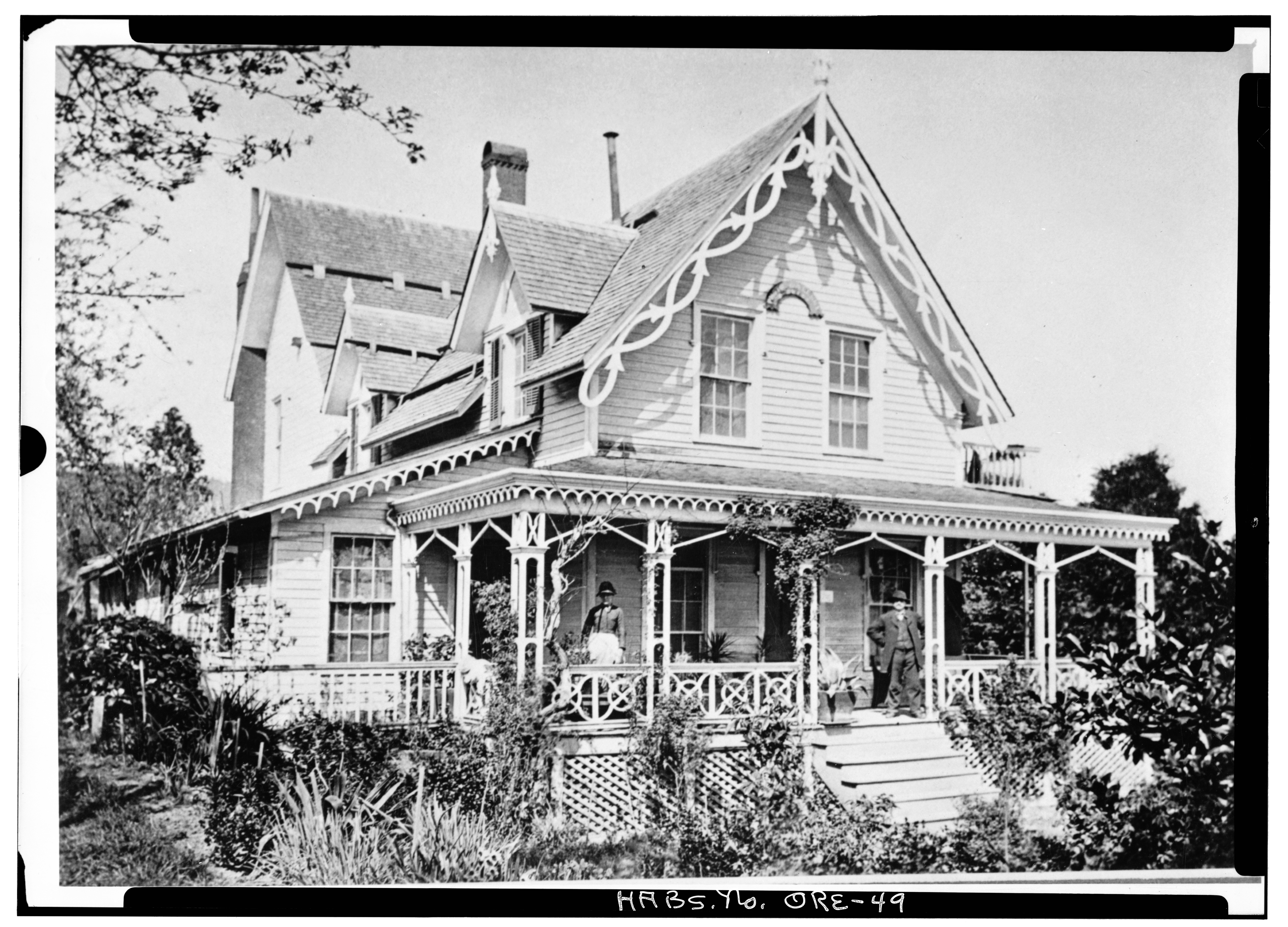
Britt house in Jacksonville, c. 1900. A fire in 1960 completely leveled the house

Peter Britt was a civic leader in his community. He served on the Jacksonville City Council twice, and on various committees. He belonged to at least four German American organizations, The Turnverein, Jacksonville Harmonie; Improved Order of Red Men, and Eintracht, a German Swiss mutual aid group. Britt handled correspondence for Eintracht, found work for young emigrants, and provided occasional lodging for travelers. After one member, Frederich Ruch, and his wife committed suicide, Peter Britt became guardian for their three sons. Britt did not participate in Jacksonville's religious community, although his children were baptized by Moses Williams, the first Presbyterian minister in Southern Oregon, and remained Presbyterians throughout their lives. Peter Britt was a follower of Robert Ingersoll, an agnostic. Britt served as vice president of the Oregon State Secular Union and helped establish the now defunct Liberal University at Silverton, Oregon, in 1896.

== Legacy ==
Britt made lasting contributions to the industry and culture of the Rogue Valley. His artistic legacy includes multiple photographs, and close to 800 of them are preserved by the Southern Oregon University and the Southern Oregon Historical Society. The Society also stores the Britt archives and a catalog of his paintings. Britt Park and the Britt Festival in Jacksonville are also testimonies to Britt's vision, hard work and success as a southern Oregon pioneer settler, who documented in his art the spirit and energy of the pioneer era.

== Recognition ==
As a visual artist, Britt secured a "significant regional photographer" rating among pioneer photographers of the American Far West. To Britt belongs the honor of taking on February 26, 1858 the first paper photograph in Oregon. The International Center of Photography in Manhattan, New York City, held an exhibition of photographs by Peter Britt in recognition of his life achievements.

In Southern Oregon, Peter Britt is still remembered and celebrated as the painter and pioneer photographer who left a rich heritage of local 19th-century portraits and landscapes. During his 50 years in Jacksonville, Oregon, he contributed to the growth of the local community in many ways, as a model citizen and family man, visual artist, gardener, orchardist, and vintner, among other activities. Although Britt's home no longer exists, his former property has become the home of the Britt Festival and Britt Gardens, as well as a part of Jacksonville’s Woodlands Trail System. The Southern Oregon Historical Society created an exhibit, Peter Britt: The Man Beyond the Camera housed in the Jacksonville Museum, with near 400 artifacts, including Britt’s personal diaries from 1859 to 1905, photographs and oil paintings, and the daguerreotype camera that he brought to Jacksonville over the Oregon Trail, among other items.
