= Central Point School District =

School district in Oregon, United States

Central Point School District 6
- Central Point and Gold Hill, Jackson County, Oregon 97502

Information
- Established: 1854
- School board: Central Point School District 6 School Board
- Superintendent: Walt Davenport
- Teaching staff: 255
- Enrollment: 4789
- Campuses: Central Point Elementary Jewett Elementary; Mae Richardson Elementary; Patrick Elementary; Rogue Primary School; Sams Valley Elementary; Hanby Middle School; Scenic Middle School Crater High School
- Website: https://www.district6.org/

Central Point School District 6 is a school district in the U.S. state of Oregon that operates schools in the communities of Central Point, Gold Hill and Sams Valley. The district is bordered directly to the south by the Medford School District, the largest school district in southern Oregon. Central Point is also to Rogue Community College and Southern Oregon University.

Central Point School District is ranked one of the best schools for student athletes in the state of Oregon (7/137) according to Niche. It is ranked 821 for student athletes nationally (out of 9934).

== Demographics ==
In the 2009 school year, the district had 72 students classified as homeless by the Department of Education, or 2.4% of students in the district. In the 2024-2025 school year, according to the Oregon Department of Education, 39% of the Central Point student body was experiencing poverty.

Central Point is ranked 52nd out of the 144 Oregon school districts on district diversity. In the 2024-2025 school year, 71% of the student body identified as white and 87% of teachers identified as white. 20% of the student body is Latino or Hispanic, 1% is Black, 1% is Asian, and 1% is indigenous.

== Schools ==
=== Elementary schools ===
- Central Point Elementary School (Mascot: Roadrunner) - Central Point
- Jewett Elementary School (Mascot: Jaguar) - Central Point
- Mae Richardson Elementary School (Mascot: Ram) - Central Point
- Patrick Elementary School (Mascot: Panther) - Gold Hill
- Sams Valley Elementary School (Mascot: Hawk) - Sams Valley

=== Middle schools ===
- Hanby Middle School (Mascot: Husky) - Gold Hill
- Scenic Middle School (Mascot: Spartan) - Central Point

=== High schools ===
- Crater High School (Mascot: Comet) - Central Point

== See also ==
- Medford School District
- List of school districts in Oregon
