= John Trudeau =

American musician (1927–2008)

- Born: Simeon John Trudeau Jr. February 26, 1927; Salem, Massachusetts, U.S.
- Died: November 3, 2008 (aged 81); Portland, Oregon, U.S.

Academic work
- Discipline: Music
- Institutions: Portland State University

Simeon John Trudeau Jr. (February 26, 1927 – November 3, 2008) was an American musician who expanded the music department at Portland State University and helped co-found the outdoor Britt Festival of performing arts in Jacksonville, Oregon, the first of its kind in the Pacific Northwest.

== Biography ==
Trudeau was born in Salem, Massachusetts, the son of Simeon John Trudeau and Adelina Beatrice Chapman. In 1951, Trudeau came to Portland, Oregon, to join the Oregon Symphony as its principal trombone player. Trudeau first came to Southern Oregon in 1955 with the Portland Symphonic Brass Ensemble for a performance at the Oregon Shakespeare Festival in Ashland, Oregon, whose founder suggested the creation of a classical musical festival in the area. Trudeau began a search, hoping to find an area that would be like Tanglewood in Massachusetts, home of the Tanglewood Music Festival.

Together with Sam McKinney they established the Britt Festival in 1963 as a two-week-long celebration of music in Jacksonville, described by The Oregonian as "a picturesque former gold-mining town in southern Oregon". The two had been searching for a site and found it in an area that had been homesteaded by Peter Britt in the 1850s, and recognized that the site's natural acoustics made it appropriate for outdoor performances. The only such festival on the West Coast of the United States when it was created, the stages were constructed with plywood and canvas, with lights set inside tin cans. By the time of Trudeau's death in 2008, the event had grown to a four-month-long performing arts event from June into September, featuring top names in classical, dance, pop, rock and musical theater and inspiring dozens of other festivals throughout the West.

Starting as an instructor, Trudeau spent 32 years at Portland State, rising to full professor, and was later appointed department chairman and ultimately dean of the School of Fine and Performing Arts. In 1977, he hired the members of the Florestan Trio as artists-in-residence and faculty members in the music department. With the group's appointment, the music department was able to attract better-qualified students. The university orchestra, which Trudeau conducted, expanded in size and improved in quality.

Trudeau died at age 81 on November 3, 2008, from complications related to congestive heart failure.
