= South Oakdale Historic District =

Historic district in Oregon, United States

- U.S. National Register of Historic Places
- U.S. Historic district
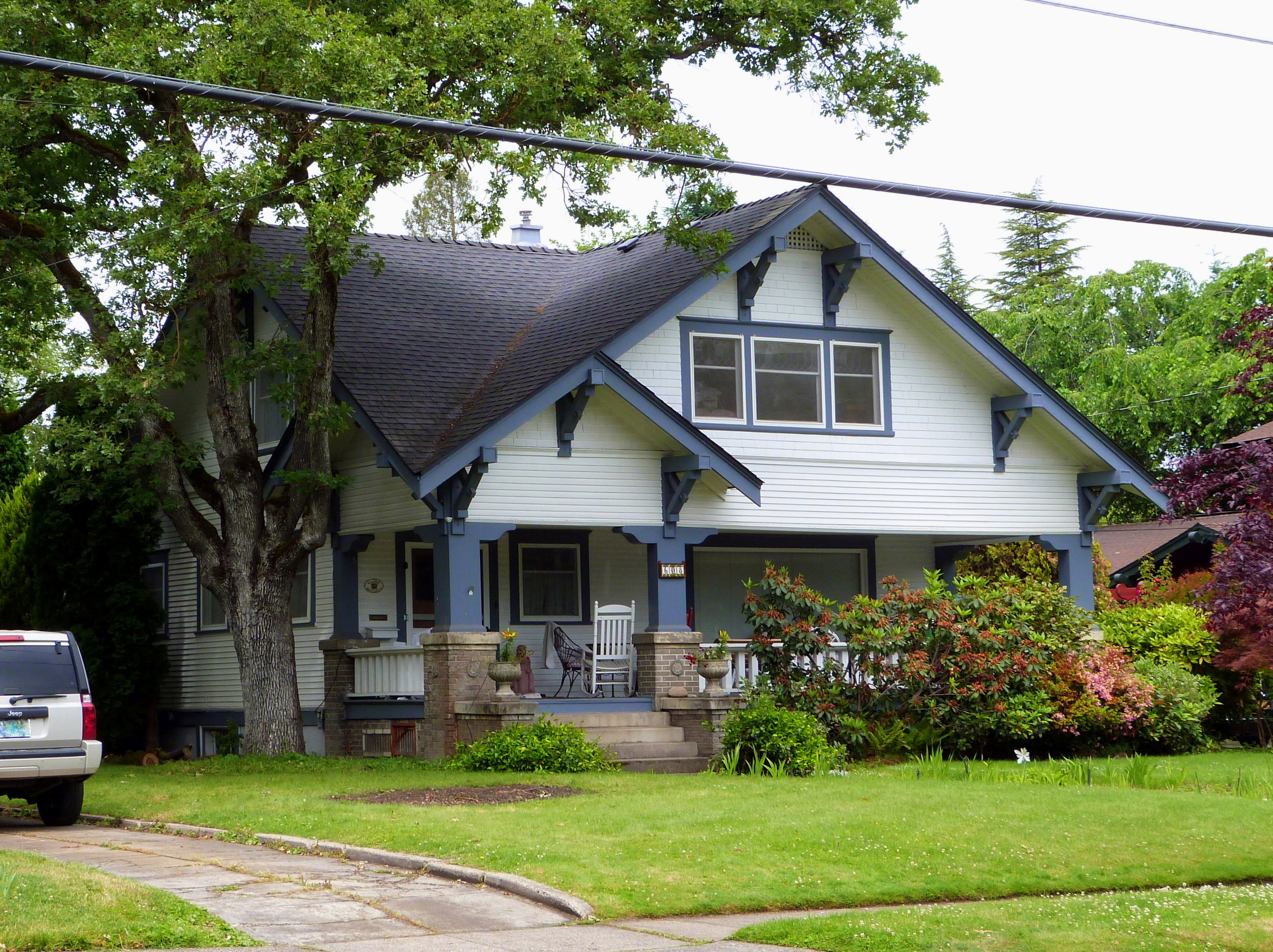
- The district's Beeson House (1926) in 2013

- Location within Oregon Location within the United States

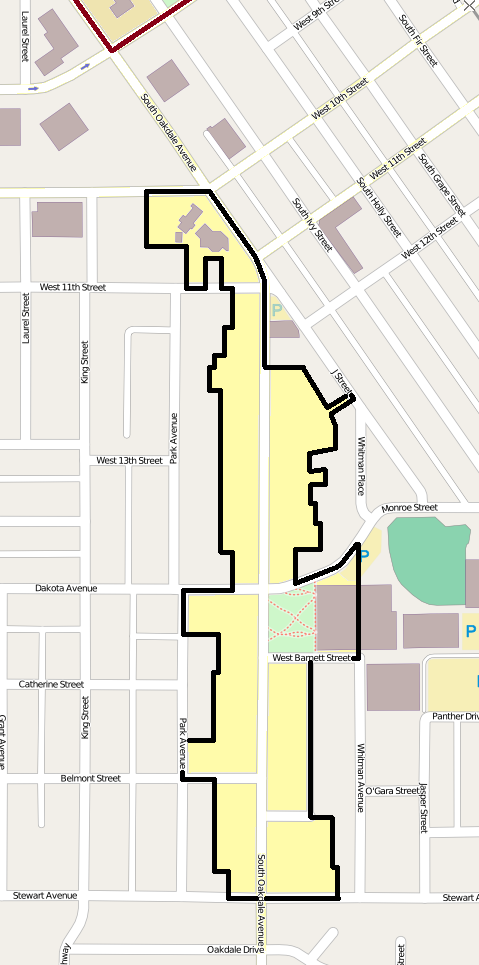
- The South Oakdale Historic District boundaries in Medford
- Location: Medford, Oregon, roughly along S. Oakdale Avenue from Stewart Avenue to W. 10th Street
- Coordinates: 42°18′58″N 122°52′28″W
- Area: Approx. 32 acres (13 ha)
- Built: 1890–1940
- Architect: Frank Chamberlain Clark, Robert Keeney, D. R. Patrick, Barrett and Logan, others
- Architectural style: Queen Anne, Bungalow, Colonial Revival, Tudor Revival, Romanesque Revival, other period revivals, Modernistic
- NRHP reference No.: 79002072
- Added to NRHP: March 15, 1979

The South Oakdale Historic District comprises a primarily residential area along South Oakdale Avenue in Medford, Oregon, United States. Development of this well-preserved residential neighborhood began in 1890, soon after Medford's founding in 1883, and continued until around 1940. It became one of the city's grand neighborhoods, with many residents prominent in land development, business, agriculture, law, medicine, education, politics, and the arts. The district exhibits a wide range of architectural styles from its period of development, notably including several works by Frank Chamberlain Clark, southern Oregon's preeminent architect of the early 20th century.

The district was added to the National Register of Historic Places in 1979.

== See also ==
- Central Medford High School
- National Register of Historic Places listings in Jackson County, Oregon
