= Spiegelberg Stadium =

High school sports stadium in Oregon, U.S.

- Location in the United States Location in Oregon
- Interactive map of Spiegelberg Stadium
- Address: 815 S. Oakdale Avenue
- Location: Medford, Oregon, U.S.
- Coordinates: 42.3166°N 122.8703°W
- Owner: Medford School District
- Operator: Medford School District
- Capacity: 9,250
- Surface: FieldTurf (2004–present); Natural grass (1936–2003)

Construction
- Opened: 1936; 90 years ago

Tenants
- South Medford High School: Football; North Medford High School: Football; Southern Oregon Renegades: Amateur Football; Southern Oregon Starphire FC (partial); Amateur Soccer

Spiegelberg Stadium, sometimes called Spieg, is a multipurpose sports stadium in the northwest United States, located in Medford, Oregon. Known as Medford Stadium until 1983, it is the home venue for both the North Medford High School and South Medford High School football programs. At capacity, Spiegelberg holds nearly 10,000 spectators in its home and away grandstands, both of which are covered. It is a unique high school football venue in the state of Oregon.

The 3A football program from nearby St. Mary's High School also uses Spiegelberg for home games, held on Saturday to avoid conflict with the larger schools contests.

Spiegelberg is home to Newland Track, which has a blue track surface. In 2004, Spiegelberg had FieldTurf installed and the track was resurfaced. In 2016 the FieldTurf was replaced and the playing surface is now known as Cobb Field, which has a traditional north-south alignment at an approximate elevation of 1,400 feet (425 m) above sea level.

== Annual events ==
=== Black and Blue Bowl ===
The Black and Blue Bowl
History
Number of meetings	40
First:	September 20, 1986
Most recent:	October 31, 2025
Next:	TBD 2026
All-time series	Even at 20–20–0
Current Streak:	2 – South Medford, 2024-2025
North Medford:	5 (1997–2001)
South Medford:	6 (2007–2012)

Every year a football game between crosstown rivals South Medford High School and North Medford High School is played. It is one of the biggest events held at Spiegelberg. Since both teams share the stadium there isn't any home field advantage.

Wins:

North Medford (20) 1989, 1990, 1992, 1993, 1994, 1995, 1997, 1998, 1999, 2000, 2001, 2003, 2005, 2006, 2013, 2014, 2015, 2019, 2022, 2023,

South Medford (20) 1986, 1987, 1988, 1991, 1996, 2002, 2004, 2007, 2008, 2009, 2010, 2011, 2012, 2016, 2017, 2018, 2020, 2021, 2024, 2025

Last 20 years

- 2006: North Medford 21, South Medford 0
- 2007: South Medford 21, North Medford 12
- 2008: South Medford 35, North Medford 14
- 2009: South Medford 28, North Medford 21
- 2010: South Medford 31, North Medford 7
- 2011: South Medford 56, North Medford 0
- 2012: South Medford 38, North Medford 3
- 2013: North Medford 42, South Medford 14
- 2014: North Medford 49, South Medford 22
- 2015: North Medford 24, South Medford 14
- 2016: South Medford 31, North Medford 21
- 2017: South Medford 55, North Medford 6
- 2018: South Medford 35, North Medford 0
- 2019: North Medford 52, South Medford 21
- 2020 (postponed to spring of 2021): South Medford 35, North Medford 34
- 2021: South Medford 40, North Medford 34
- 2022: North Medford 35, South Medford 0
- 2023: North Medford 10, South Medford 0
- 2024: South Medford 33, North Medford 30
  - Post-season 2024: North Medford 31, South Medford 14
- 2025: South Medford 30, North Medford 0

=== Black and Maroon Bowl ===
This is also an annual game between the cross town rivals Hedrick Middle School and McLoughlin Middle School. While this event is not nearly as big as the Black and Blue Bowl, it is the Game of the Year for middle school students in Medford.

- 1999: Hedrick 42, Mcloughlin 8
- 2006: Hedrick 28, McLoughlin 0
- 2007: Hedrick 38, McLoughlin 0
- 2008: Hedrick 30, McLoughlin 6
- 2009: Hedrick 35, McLoughlin 21
- 2010: Hedrick 35, McLoughlin 0
- 2011: McLoughlin 28, Hedrick 20
- 2012: Hedrick 14, McLoughlin 7
- 2013: McLoughlin 22, Hedrick 0

== See also ==
- Medford School District 549C
