= Lynching of Robert S. Maynard =

1852 lynching in Oregon, United States

Robert S. Maynard was a 21-year-old American man from Illinois who was lynched in Jacksonville, Oregon, in May 1852 as a result of his murder of J. C. Platt. As Maynard was extrajudicially killed by hanging, this was the first recorded hanging and first recorded lynching in Southern Oregon, where no courts had yet been appointed.

== Background ==
Maynard used the aliases Jackson Maynard and "John Brown," and multiple sources use solely Brown. He was described as a gambler, and as a man from Pike County, Illinois. Gold having been discovered late in 1851, Jacksonville was only founded the same year of the killing, and the area was known at the time as Rogue River.

== Murder ==
Maynard shot J.C. Platt (also known as John D. Platt and as Samuel Potts) with a borrowed gun because Platt called him a liar; the shot man "made no attempt to assault."

== Lynching ==
Maynard was executed by hanging by miners in what The Daily Alta California characterized as a "lynching." Maynard asked the onlookers that they point to his grave and "say there lies a man who would not be insulted".

As there were no organized courts of law at the time, the killing was called "mob law" and "necessary" by press in New York; likewise, the 1884 History of Southern Oregon described the extrajudicial killing as "a law higher, stronger, more effective than written codes [...] administered by the people's court."

Conversely, Herman F. Reinhart attested a few years later that «excited miners [...] worked up a prejudice against the gambler», as gamblers had become «very obnoxious to the miners, who had lost money» with them, Maynard being one of those, and as a consequence the «miners were for lynching» Maynard right away. The miners appointed «fifty men (Vigilantes)» to keep Maynard from escaping until the hanging.

Fifty years after the hanging, The Sunday Oregonian characterized the lynching as "swift and unerring justice of the miners."

== Bibliography ==
- Plymale, W. J. (June 21, 1903). "First Hanging in Southern Oregon". The Sunday Oregonian. No. 25, Vol. XXII. Portland. p. 15. OCLC 9677940.
- Reinhart, Herman Francis (1962). "2. Mining Apprenticeship: Siskiyou County". In Nunis, Doyce B. (ed.). The Golden Frontier: The Recollections of Herman Francis Reinhart, 1851-1869. University of Texas Press. p. 382. doi:10.7560/732513. ISBN 978-1-4773-0187-6.
- "From Shasta". Sacramento Daily Union. May 24, 1852. p. 2.
- "Murder and Execution on Rogue River". The Oregon Statesman. No. 11, Vol. II. Oregon City, Oregon Territory: Asahel Bush. June 1, 1852. p. 2.
- "XLIII — Jacksonville". History of Southern Oregon. A. G. Walling. 1884. p. 545. LCCN a14001444.
