= Rogue Creamery =

American cheese maker

Coordinates: 42.376365°N 122.920558°W

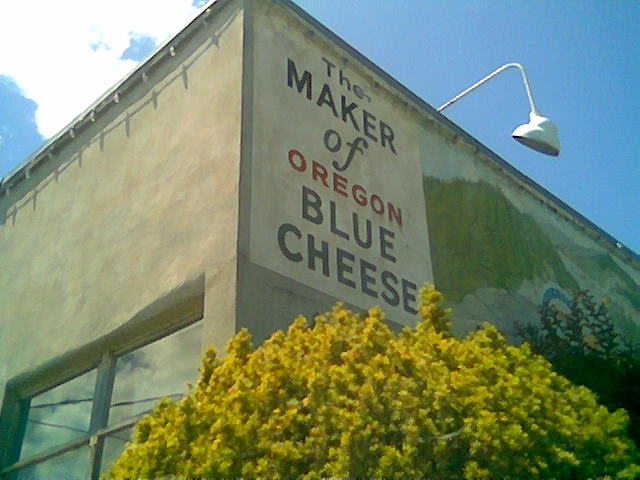
- Founded: 1933
- Headquarters: Central Point, Oregon
- Parent: Savencia Fromage & Dairy
- Website: https://roguecreamery.com/

Rogue Creamery is an American cheese maker based in Central Point, Oregon founded in 1933. Since 2002, Rogue Creamery has been making artisan cheeses. Founder Tom Vella brought mold, cultures and recipes for Oregon Blue to Central Point from Roquefort, France. Rogue Creamery was the first U.S. cheese maker to export raw-milk cheese to the European Union. Their products can be found in other countries including the United Kingdom, Australia and Japan.

== Reception ==
In their first competition under new owner David Gremmels, Rogue's Rogue River Blue won the 2003 World Cheese Award for best blue cheese.

Rogue's Rogue River Blue won best blue cheese in the world at the 2012 World Cheese Awards and two medals out of 2,781 cheeses from around the world. Rogue Creamery won four medals—two silver and two bronze—at the 2013 World Cheese Awards, the world’s largest cheese event and the most respected competition of its type in the world. There were more than 2,700 cheeses from 34 countries with 250 judges. Rogue won again in 2014 with one bronze medal and one super gold medal, making it one of the top 60 cheese in the world.

In 2019, the company's Rogue River Blue cheese became the first American-made cheese to be named the World Champion at the World Cheese Awards in Bergamo, Italy.

In June 2021, Rogue Creamery won the Innovation Center for U.S. Dairy's Outstanding Dairy Processing and Manufacturing Sustainability Award.
