= Clayton Klein =

American politician (born 1949)

Member of the Oregon House of Representatives from the 50th district
- In office 1977–1981
- Preceded by: Al Densmore
- Succeeded by: Rebecca DeBoer

Personal details
- Born: November 13, 1949 (age 76) Tillamook, Oregon, U.S.
- Party: Democratic

Clayton C. Klein Jr. (born November 13, 1949) is a former member of the Oregon House of Representatives, representing Central Point, Oregon, and portions of Jackson County, Oregon, United States. He served two terms, from January 1977 through 1980, in the 59th Oregon Legislative Assembly and the 60th (in 1979), as well as a 1980 special session.

A Democrat, Clayton Klein was first elected to the Oregon Legislature in November 1976, taking office in January 1977. During his first term, he argued in favor of legislation, which ultimately did not pass, that would have lowered the legal drinking age from 21 to 18. A few years earlier, while attending Southern Oregon College, he had been co-leader of a student group pushing to place on the ballot a measure asking Oregon voters to make that change.

Klein was reelected in November 1978 to a second two-year term. In January 1979, he was elected House majority whip by his fellow legislators.

He ran again for the seat in 1980, but was defeated in the November general election by Republican Rebecca DeBoer.
