= Jackson School District =

Jackson School District or Jackson County School District (JCSD) may refer to:

- Jackson City School, Jackson, Kentucky
- Jackson County Public Schools (Kentucky), headquarters in McKee
- Jackson County Public Schools (North Carolina), headquarters in Sylva
- Jackson County School Board (Florida), headquarters in Marianna
- Jackson County School District (Alabama)
- Jackson County School District (Arkansas)
- Jackson County School District (Mississippi)
- Jackson County Schools (West Virginia), headquarters in Ripley
- Jackson Local School District, in Stark County, Ohio
- Jackson Public School District, in Jackson, Mississippi
- Jackson School District (New Jersey), in Jackson Township

Jackson School District also may refer to:

- Jackson County School District, former name of Central Point School District in Oregon
