= 1878 Oregon gubernatorial election =

- June 3, 1878
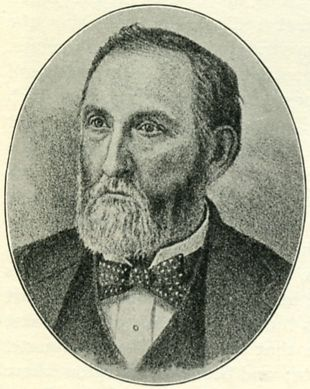

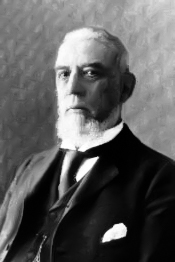
Nominee	William Wallace Thayer	Cornelius C. Beekman
Party	Democratic	Republican
Popular vote	16,201	16,132
Percentage	46.02%	45.83%
- County results Thayer: 40–50% 50–60% 60–70% Beekman: 40–50% 50–60% 60–70% Tie: 40–50%
Governor before election
Stephen F. Chadwick
Democratic
Elected Governor
W. W. Thayer
Democratic

The 1878 Oregon gubernatorial election took place on June 3, 1878, to elect the governor of the U.S. state of Oregon. The election matched Republican Cornelius C. Beekman against Democrat William Wallace Thayer, with Thayer defeating Beekman by a very small margin. With a margin of 69 votes, or 0.2%, this is the closest gubernatorial election in Oregon to date.

== Results ==
1878 Oregon gubernatorial election
Party	Candidate	Votes	%	±%
Democratic	William Wallace Thayer	16,201	46.02%	+7.80%
Republican	Cornelius C. Beekman	16,132	45.83%	+9.77%
Independent	M. Wilkins	1,434	4.07%	
Total votes		35,201	100.00%	
Plurality		69	0.20%	
Democratic hold		Swing	-1.97%	

=== Results by county ===
County	William W. Thayer Democratic		Cornelius C. Beekman Republican		M. Wilkins Independent		Margin		Total votes cast
County	#	%	#	%	#	%	#	%	Total votes cast
Baker	543	59.67%	366	40.22%	1	0.11%	177	19.45%	910
Benton	609	43.72%	640	45.94%	144	10.34%	-31	-2.23%	1,393
Clackamas	765	42.15%	997	54.93%	53	2.92%	-232	-12.78%	1,815
Clatsop (Note: The House and Senate journals neglected to include the results from Clatsop County in their tables for the gubernatorial vote, but those votes were clearly counted because the county by county results as listed in the journals do not added up to the stated totals. However, when the Clatsop results are included, the county results for all three candidates add up correctly. The results from Clatsop County were reported in multiple newspapers throughout the state, albeit with some inconsistency. However, using the figures from the Weekly Astorian yields the correct statewide totals.)	512	49.37%	522	50.34%	3	0.29%	-10	-0.96%	1,037
Columbia	205	52.84%	183	47.16%	0	0.00%	22	5.67%	388
Coos	536	48.86%	561	51.14%	0	0.00%	-25	-2.28%	1,097
Curry	167	52.02%	154	47.98%	0	0.00%	13	4.05%	321
Douglas	1,106	51.30%	1,046	48.52%	4	0.19%	60	2.78%	2,156
Grant	458	48.67%	476	50.58%	7	0.74%	-18	-1.91%	941
Jackson	746	46.48%	713	44.42%	146	9.10%	33	2.06%	1,605
Josephine	240	48.39%	191	38.51%	65	13.10%	49	9.88%	496
Lake	319	68.31%	143	30.62%	5	1.07%	176	37.69%	467
Lane	926	45.98%	926	45.98%	162	8.04%	0	0.00%	2,014
Linn	1,420	47.44%	1,134	37.89%	439	14.67%	286	9.56%	2,993
Marion	1,212	39.83%	1,702	55.93%	129	4.24%	-490	-16.10%	3,043
Multnomah	1,808	44.36%	2,254	55.30%	14	0.34%	-446	-10.94%	4,076
Polk	717	46.62%	655	42.59%	166	10.79%	62	4.03%	1,538
Tillamook	67	35.08%	121	63.35%	3	1.57%	-54	-28.27%	191
Umatilla	972	60.26%	641	39.74%	0	0.00%	331	20.52%	1,613
Union	625	53.24%	469	39.95%	80	6.81%	156	13.29%	1,174
Wasco	863	57.80%	623	41.73%	7	0.47%	240	16.08%	1,493
Washington	553	42.38%	748	57.32%	4	0.31%	-195	-14.94%	1,305
Yamhill	832	48.91%	867	50.97%	2	0.12%	-35	-2.06%	1,701
Total	16,201	46.02%	16,132	45.83%	1,434	4.07%	69	0.20%	35,201

==== Counties that flipped from Republican to Democratic ====
- Curry

==== Counties that flipped from Independent to Democratic ====
- Douglas
- Polk

==== Counties that flipped from Democratic to Republican ====
- Clackamas
- Yamhill

==== Counties that flipped from Independent to Republican ====
- Grant
- Washington
