= Jim Chrest =

American politician

Member of the Oregon House of Representatives from the 15th district
- In office 1974–1982

Personal details
- Born: September 3, 1938 Bowbells, North Dakota
- Died: August 26, 2015 (aged 76) Surprise, Arizona
- Party: Democratic
- Profession: marine clerk

James H. Chrest (September 3, 1938 - August 26, 2015), was an American politician who was a member of the Oregon House of Representatives. He was a marine clerk.
