= Britt Festival =

Britt Music & Arts Festival
- Status: Active
- Genre: Performing arts festival
- Frequency: Annually
- Venue: Britt Pavilion
- Locations: Jacksonville, Oregon, United States
- Years active: 1963–present
- Inaugurated: 1963
- Founder: John Trudeau
- Website: brittfest.org

The Britt Music & Arts Festival is a non-profit performing arts festival located in Jacksonville, Oregon. Since its creation it has been among the premier performing arts festivals in the Northwest, and has managed to attract high-profile and local acts in music for decades. Britt also sponsors a number of educational programs through its educational arm The Britt Institute. Its main mission is, "to invite audiences and artists to celebrate the joy of live performance, the power of community and the magic of the Britt Experience."

== History ==
The idea for Britt originated in 1963, when Portland conductor John Trudeau and several friends visiting southern Oregon in search of a place to start a summer music festival. The former hillside estate of Jacksonville pioneer Peter Britt was perfect, with its natural acoustics and scenic views of the valley in the distance. The beauty of the valley further motivated them to start something, and that summer a plywood stage was built. A local orchestra provided the only music until 1978, when the current pavilion was constructed. From there the festival continued to grow to include more seats and attract national attention, with high-profile artists frequently performing.

Performances take place in the Britt Park, which is owned by Jackson County, but is under long-term lease to Britt.

== Location ==
Most Britt Festivals' performances take place in Jacksonville, Oregon at the Britt Pavilion.

== See also ==
- List of music festivals in the United States
