= Central Point, Oregon =

- City
- Nickname: The Fair City
- Location in Oregon
- Coordinates: 42°22′24″N 122°54′38″W
- Country: United States
- State: Oregon
- County: Jackson
- Incorporated: 1889

Area
  - Total: 3.94 sq mi (10.21 km^{2})
  - Land: 3.94 sq mi (10.21 km^{2})
  - Water: 0 sq mi (0.00 km^{2})
- Elevation: 1,273 ft (388 m)

Population (2020)
  - Total: 18,997
  - Density: 4,821/sq mi (1,861.3/km^{2})
- Time zone: UTC−8 (Pacific)
  - Summer (DST): UTC−7 (Pacific)
- ZIP code: 97502
- Area code: Area code 541/458
- FIPS code: 41-12400
- GNIS feature ID: 2409428
- Website: www.centralpointoregon.gov

Central Point is a city in Jackson County, Oregon, United States. The population was 18,997 as of 2020. The city shares its southern border with Medford and is a part of the Medford metropolitan area. Central Point is home of the Jackson County Fair that occurs in July.

== History ==
Isaac Constant, a pioneer who settled here in 1852, named the location Central Point because of its location at a crossroads in the middle of the Rogue Valley. At this point, the main north–south road from the Willamette Valley met the road between Jacksonville and settlements along the Rogue River. In about 1870, Magruder Brothers opened a store at the crossroads. In 1872, a post office was established here under the name Central Point.

== Geography ==
According to the United States Census Bureau, the city has a total area of 3.90 square miles (10.10 km^{2}), all of it land.

The city lies at an elevation of about 1,272 feet (388 m) along Oregon Highway 99 and Interstate 5 northwest of Medford. Jacksonville is to the south and Gold Hill to the northwest. The Central Oregon and Pacific Railroad passes through Central Point.

Griffin Creek, a tributary of Bear Creek, joins the larger stream at Central Point. The Bear Creek Greenway, a biking and hiking trail connecting Ashland, Talent, Phoenix and Medford along Bear Creek, also passes through Central Point.

=== Climate ===
This region experiences warm (but not hot) and dry summers, with no average monthly temperatures above 71.6 °F (22.0 °C). According to the Köppen Climate Classification system, Central Point has a warm-summer Mediterranean climate, abbreviated "Csb" on climate maps.

Climate data for Central Point, Oregon
| Month | Jan | Feb | Mar | Apr | May | Jun | Jul | Aug | Sep | Oct | Nov | Dec | Year |
|---|---|---|---|---|---|---|---|---|---|---|---|---|---|
| Record high °F (°C) | 71 (22) | 80 (27) | 86 (30) | 96 (36) | 103 (39) | 115 (46) | 115 (46) | 114 (46) | 110 (43) | 100 (38) | 82 (28) | 72 (22) | 115 (46) |
| Mean daily maximum °F (°C) | 48 (9) | 54 (12) | 59 (15) | 65 (18) | 73 (23) | 82 (28) | 92 (33) | 91 (33) | 84 (29) | 70 (21) | 53 (12) | 46 (8) | 68 (20) |
| Mean daily minimum °F (°C) | 32 (0) | 34 (1) | 36 (2) | 40 (4) | 45 (7) | 51 (11) | 57 (14) | 56 (13) | 49 (9) | 42 (6) | 36 (2) | 30 (−1) | 42 (6) |
| Record low °F (°C) | −3 (−19) | 6 (−14) | 16 (−9) | 21 (−6) | 28 (−2) | 31 (−1) | 38 (3) | 39 (4) | 29 (−2) | 18 (−8) | 10 (−12) | −10 (−23) | −10 (−23) |
| Average precipitation inches (mm) | 2.42 (61) | 2.01 (51) | 1.71 (43) | 1.38 (35) | 1.30 (33) | 0.62 (16) | 0.28 (7.1) | 0.40 (10) | 0.57 (14) | 1.13 (29) | 3.01 (76) | 3.49 (89) | 18.32 (464.1) |
| Average snowfall inches (cm) | 1.3 (3.3) | 0.6 (1.5) | 0.4 (1.0) | 0 (0) | 0 (0) | 0 (0) | 0 (0) | 0 (0) | 0 (0) | 0 (0) | 0.2 (0.51) | 1.1 (2.8) | 3.6 (9.1) |
Source: Medford Weather Forecast Office

== Demographics ==
Historical population
| Census | Pop. | Note | %± |
|---|---|---|---|
| 1890 | 534 | | — |
| 1900 | 322 | | −39.7% |
| 1910 | 761 | | 136.3% |
| 1920 | 582 | | −23.5% |
| 1930 | 821 | | 41.1% |
| 1940 | 906 | | 10.4% |
| 1950 | 1,667 | | 84.0% |
| 1960 | 2,289 | | 37.3% |
| 1970 | 4,004 | | 74.9% |
| 1980 | 6,357 | | 58.8% |
| 1990 | 7,509 | | 18.1% |
| 2000 | 12,493 | | 66.4% |
| 2010 | 17,169 | | 37.4% |
| 2020 | 18,997 | | 10.6% |

Five of the eight public schools of the Central Point School District are located in the city: Central Point Elementary School, Mae Richardson Elementary School, Jewett Elementary School, Scenic Middle School, and Crater High School.

=== 2020 census ===
As of the 2020 census, Central Point had a population of 18,997. The median age was 39.7 years. 23.6% of residents were under the age of 18 and 20.3% of residents were 65 years of age or older. For every 100 females there were 91.1 males, and for every 100 females age 18 and over there were 89.0 males age 18 and over.

100.0% of residents lived in urban areas, while 0% lived in rural areas.

There were 7,396 households in Central Point, of which 32.6% had children under the age of 18 living in them. Of all households, 49.9% were married-couple households, 15.2% were households with a male householder and no spouse or partner present, and 26.9% were households with a female householder and no spouse or partner present. About 24.1% of all households were made up of individuals and 13.4% had someone living alone who was 65 years of age or older.

There were 7,564 housing units, of which 2.2% were vacant. Among occupied housing units, 65.3% were owner-occupied and 34.7% were renter-occupied. The homeowner vacancy rate was 0.6% and the rental vacancy rate was 2.6%.

Racial composition as of the 2020 census
| Race | Number | Percent |
|---|---|---|
| White | 15,735 | 82.8% |
| Black or African American | 112 | 0.6% |
| American Indian and Alaska Native | 235 | 1.2% |
| Asian | 295 | 1.6% |
| Native Hawaiian and Other Pacific Islander | 63 | 0.3% |
| Some other race | 737 | 3.9% |
| Two or more races | 1,820 | 9.6% |
| Hispanic or Latino (of any race) | 2,185 | 11.5% |

=== 2010 census ===
As of the census of 2010, there were 17,169 people, 6,542 households, and 4,670 families living in the city. The population density was 4,402.3 inhabitants per square mile (1,699.7/km^{2}). There were 6,975 housing units at an average density of 1,788.5 units per square mile (690.5 units/km^{2}). The racial makeup of the city was 90.8% White, 0.4% African American, 1.0% Native American, 1.0% Asian, 0.4% Pacific Islander, 3.1% from other races, and 3.2% from two or more races. Hispanic or Latino of any race were 9.0% of the population.

There were 6,542 households, of which 37.2% had children under the age of 18 living with them, 53.8% were married couples living together, 12.5% had a female householder with no husband present, 5.1% had a male householder with no wife present, and 28.6% were non-families. 22.5% of all households were made up of individuals, and 11.4% had someone living alone who was 65 years of age or older. The average household size was 2.61 and the average family size was 3.03.

The median age in the city was 36.5 years. 26.5% of residents were under the age of 18; 8.1% were between the ages of 18 and 24; 26.8% were from 25 to 44; 23.7% were from 45 to 64; and 14.8% were 65 years of age or older. The gender makeup of the city was 48.1% male and 51.9% female.

=== 2000 census ===
As of the census of 2000, there were 12,493 people, 4,613 households, and 3,450 families living in the city. The population density was 4,073.6 inhabitants per square mile (1,572.8/km^{2}). There were 4,760 housing units at an average density of 1,552.1 units per square mile (599.3 units/km^{2}). The racial makeup of the city was 94.00% White, 0.25% African American, 0.88% Native American, 0.73% Asian, 0.19% Pacific Islander, 1.26% from other races, and 2.69% from two or more races. Hispanic or Latino of any race were 4.22% of the population.

There were 4,613 households, out of which 37.5% had children under the age of 18 living with them, 59.2% were married couples living together, 11.5% had a female householder with no husband present, and 25.2% were non-families. 20.0% of all households were made up of individuals, and 9.6% had someone living alone who was 65 years of age or older. The average household size was 2.69 and the average family size was 3.06.

In the city, the population was spread out, with 28.6% under the age of 18, 7.8% from 18 to 24, 29.2% from 25 to 44, 20.2% from 45 to 64, and 14.2% who were 65 years of age or older. The median age was 34 years. For every 100 females, there were 91.9 males. For every 100 females age 18 and over, there were 89.2 males.

The median income for a household in the city was $40,622, and the median income for a family was $44,849. Males had a median income of $32,778 versus $23,851 for females. The per capita income for the city was $17,003. About 5.9% of families and 6.6% of the population were below the poverty line, including 10.2% of those under age 18 and 3.1% of those age 65 or over.

== Economy ==
Talk Radio Network, Erickson Air Crane, and Crater Rock Museum are located in Central Point. Rogue Creamery in Central Point makes some of the world's best cheeses, according to judges at the World Cheese Awards and American Cheese Society Awards. Agriculture is dominated by the pear, wine, and recently industrial hemp.

=== Top employers ===
According to the city's 2020 Comprehensive Annual Financial Report, the top employers in the city are:

| # | Employer | # of Employees |
|---|---|---|
| 1 | School District 6 | 673 |
| 2 | Costco | 384 |
| 3 | Knife River Materials | 142 |
| 4 | Pilot Travel Center | 110 |
| 5 | USF Reddaway | 110 |
| 6 | So. Ore. Veterinary | 110 |
| 7 | Albertsons | 100 |
| 8 | City of Central Point | 75 |
| 9 | McDonald's | 48 |

== Notable people ==
- Jason Atkinson, Oregon State Senator and 2006/2010 gubernatorial candidate
- Eugene Bennett, fine artist.
- Amy Denson, professional basketball player.
- Lisa Franchetti, United States Navy Vice Admiral.
- Dean Hartgraves, major league baseball pitcher.
- Clayton Klein, a former Oregon State Representative
- Bryce Peila, football player who played for the Portland Steel of the Arena Football League
- Dennis Richardson, former Oregon Secretary of State
- Basil Wolverton, comic book artist, Marvel & Mad magazine.
