= Medford School District (Oregon) =

School district in the state of Oregon, US

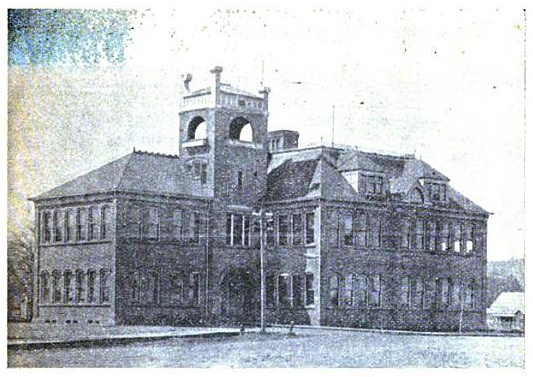

Location
- Medford, Oregon United States

District information
- Grades: K–12
- Superintendent: Dr. Bret Champion
- Schools: 24

Students and staff
- Students: 13,981
- Teachers: 645
- Staff: 654

Other information
- Website: Medford School District Homepage

Medford School District (549C) is a school district in the U.S. state of Oregon. It is the largest school district of southern Oregon. The district is bordered directly to the north by the Central Point School District and on the south by the Phoenix-Talent School District. (Other nearby districts include the Ashland School District, Grants Pass School District, and Klamath Falls City School District). Today, district 549C encompasses 14 primary schools, two secondary schools, and three high schools in three cities: Medford, Jacksonville, and Ruch. As of 2018, district enrollment stood at 13,981 students.

The Medford School District passed a school bond in November 2006 that collected $189 million to completely rebuild South Medford High School and Lone Pine Elementary School. Some remodeling was done to North Medford High School. All schools received a part of the bond money for repairs and renovations. Wednesday, September 9, 2010 marked the first full day of class for all students at the new South Medford High School on Cunningham Avenue. The same day marked the re-opening of the remodeled North Medford High School for all students.

== Schools ==
=== Elementary Schools (K–5) ===
- Abraham Lincoln
- Griffin Creek
- Hoover
- Howard
- Jackson
- Jacksonville
- Kennedy
- Lone Pine
- Oak Grove
- Roosevelt
- Ruch
- Washington
- Wilson

=== Middle Schools (6–8) ===
- Hedrick
- McLoughlin
- Oakdale
- Ruch

=== High Schools (9–12) ===
- North Medford
- South Medford

== Demographics ==
In the 2017-2019 school year, district student demographics were as follows:

- American Indian/Alaska Native: 1%
- Asian: 1%
- Black/African America: 1%
- Hispanic/Latino: 26%
- Multiracial: 5%
- Native Hawaiian/Pacific Islander: 1%
- White: 66%
- English Learner: 14%
- Students with Disabilities: 15%
- Free/Reduced Lunch: 67%
- Required Vaccinations: 91%
- Languages Spoken: 38

== See also ==
- Spiegelberg Stadium
- Central Point School District
