= Oakdale Middle School (Medford, Oregon) =

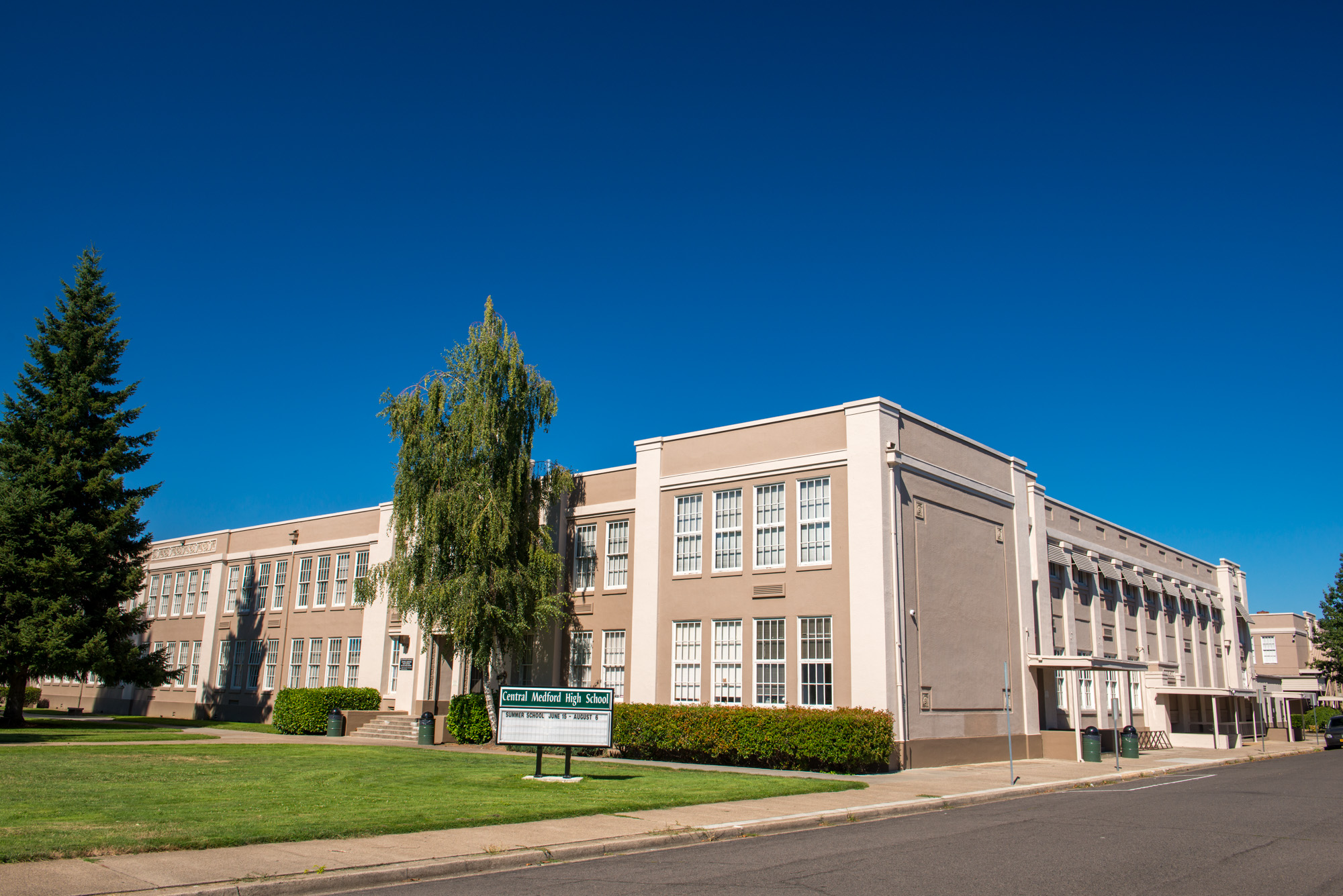

Location
- 650 Royal Avenue; Medford, Oregon, (Jackson County), Oregon 97504; United States

Information
- Type: Public
- Opened: 2023
- School district: Medford School District
- Principal: Karina Rizo
- Grades: 6-8
- Enrollment: 822
- Colors: Purple and Black
- Mascot: Owl
- Feeder to: South Medford High School
- Website: https://oakdale.medford.k12.or.us
- Medford Senior High School
- U.S. Historic district – Contributing property
- Location within Oregon Location within the United States
- Built: 1931
- Architect: Frank Chamberlain Clark
- Architectural style: Art Deco
- Part of: South Oakdale Historic District (ID79002072)

Oakdale Middle School (OMS) is a public middle school serving grades 6–8 in Medford, Oregon, United States. It is the third and newest middle school in the Medford School District, but is the only school in the district to be registered as a member of the National Register of Historic Places. As of 2025, there are a total of 822 students at the school.

The campus of OMS holds Fred Spiegelberg Stadium, the main stadium used for football competitions between the two high schools.

== History ==
While the building was built in 1931, Oakdale Middle School only opened in 2023. The school opened in part of a greater initiative across all schools in the Medford School District to move sixth grade from elementary school to middle school.

The campus was first built in 1931 as Medford High School, but later became South Medford High School after the opening of North Medford High School. After a new building was constructed for SMHS, the former building became an alternative school called Central Medford High School, which was ultimately moved in 2020 and shut down.

After major renovations to improve safety and learning experience, the middle school opened in 2023 to reduce overcrowding at the other two middle schools in the district. It held a grand opening ceremony in September to welcome all new families, as it had taken students from both Hedrick Middle School and McLoughlin Middle School.

In 2024, the school introduced a veteran memorial area.
