= Jacksonville Historic District (Jacksonville, Oregon) =

Historic district in Oregon, United States

- U.S. National Register of Historic Places
- U.S. National Historic Landmark District
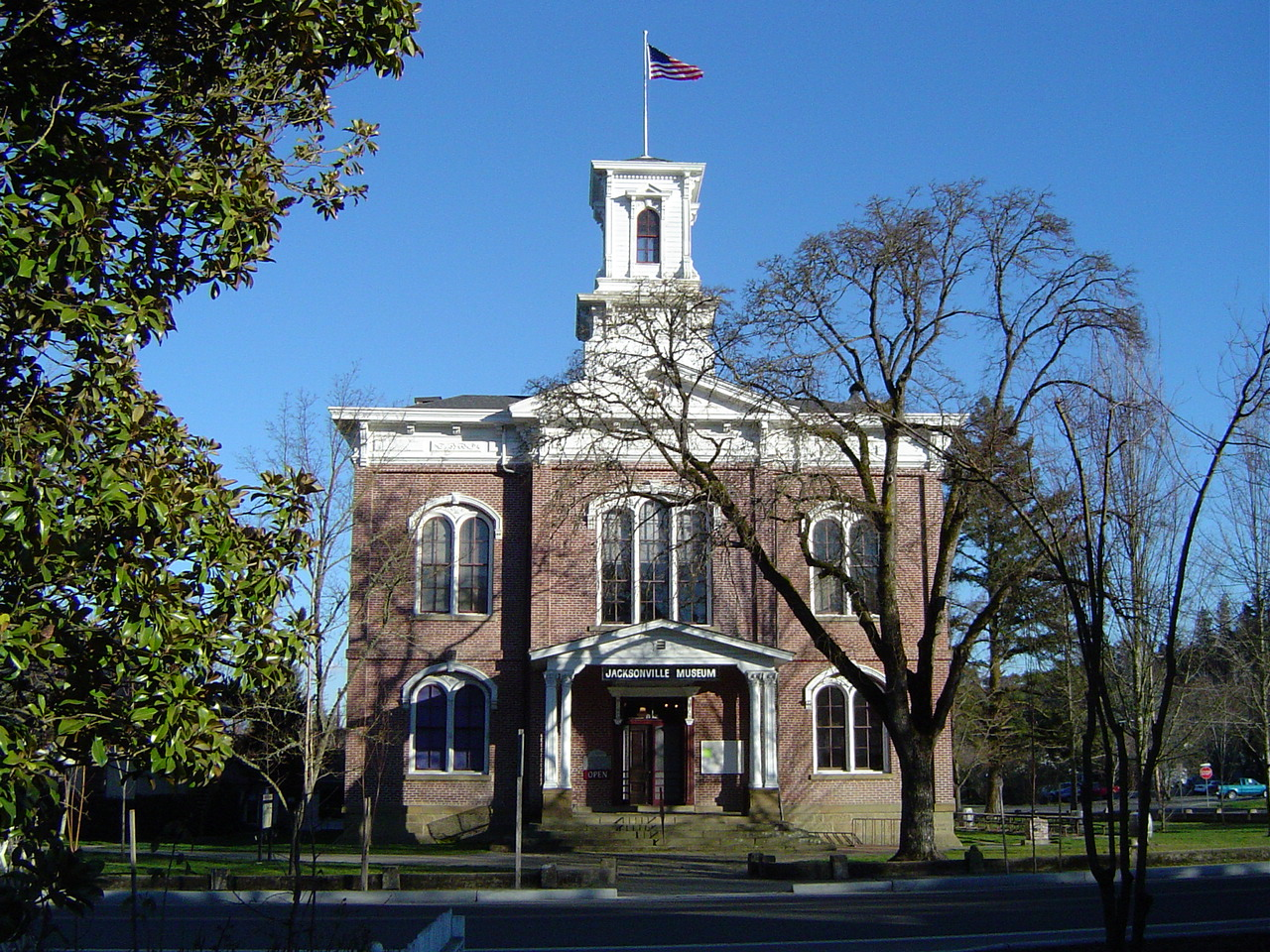
- Jacksonville Museum, the former Jackson County Courthouse.

- Location within Oregon Location within the United States
- Location: Jacksonville, Oregon
- Coordinates: 42°18′45″N 122°58′0″W
- Area: 326 acres (132 ha)
- Built: 1853
- Architectural style: Greek Revival, Italian Villa, Gothic Revival
- NRHP reference No.: 66000950

Significant dates
- Added to NRHP: November 13, 1966
- Designated NHLD: November 13, 1966

The Jacksonville Historic District encompasses the historic core of the 19th-century mining town of Jacksonville, Oregon. The city was a major mining, civic, and commercial center from 1852 to 1884, and declined thereafter, leaving a little-altered assemblage of architecture from that period. The district was designated a U.S. National Historic Landmark in 1966.

== Description and history ==
The city of Jacksonville was founded in 1852 after gold was found in the nearby hills. It grew quite rapidly in its first year, and became the county seat of Jackson County when that county was organized in 1853. It became the principal financial and commercial center in the mining country of southwestern Oregon, and flourished until the 1870s. In 1873, a significant portion of the city was destroyed by fire. Although much was rebuilt afterward, the city's decline in importance was cemented when the railroad bypassed it, and the county seat was relocated to Medford in 1927.

The historic district includes the city's central commercial district, on East California Street, and extends mainly northward to include adjacent residential areas. The former county courthouse is now a museum property of the local historical society, interpreting the city's history. The building stock is architecturally diverse, but limited to styles that were popular between the 1850s and 1880s in the region: the Greek Revival, Italianate, and Gothic Revival. Particularly well-preserved buildings include the 1856 Beekman Bank, which retains all of the original fixtures for a period bank. The district also includes the city's first cemetery, established in 1860.

== See also ==
- National Register of Historic Places listings in Jackson County, Oregon
- List of National Historic Landmarks in Oregon
