= North Medford High School =

Location
- 1900 North Keene Way Drive; Medford, Jackson County, Oregon; United States; 42.347329°N 122.850913°W

Information
- Type: Public
- Opened: 1966
- School district: Medford School District
- Principal: Allen Barber
- Teaching staff: 74.39 (FTE)
- Grades: 9–12
- Enrollment: 1,661 (2023–2024)
- Student to teacher ratio: 22.33
- Colors: Black,Red and White
- Athletics conference: OSAA Southwest Conference 6A-6
- Mascot: Black Tornado
- Team name: North Medford Black Tornado
- Rival: South Medford High School
- Newspaper: Tornado Times
- Website: Official website

North Medford High School is a public high school in Medford, Oregon, United States. It is part of Medford School District. Its nickname is the Black Tornado. The school enrolls 1,750 students.

== History ==
Originally the City of Medford had a single high school, Medford High School, constructed in the 1920s. In the 1960s, the school district expanded, constructing a new high school on the opposite side of the city. Rather than develop this into an independent school, the district kept Medford High School as the lone school, with students attending at the two different locations. The current campus of NMHS was the newly constructed "Medford Senior High School", with grades 11 and 12 attending while grades 9 and 10 went to Medford Mid High School, which later became South Medford High School (SMHS) and ultimately Central Medford High School. (SMHS has since moved into a new building). This was set in place to primarily to allow Medford to compete athletically with larger school districts such as Portland Public Schools of Portland. At this time the city would have been placed in smaller athletic (then 2A) divisions if the district had been divided into two secondary schools.

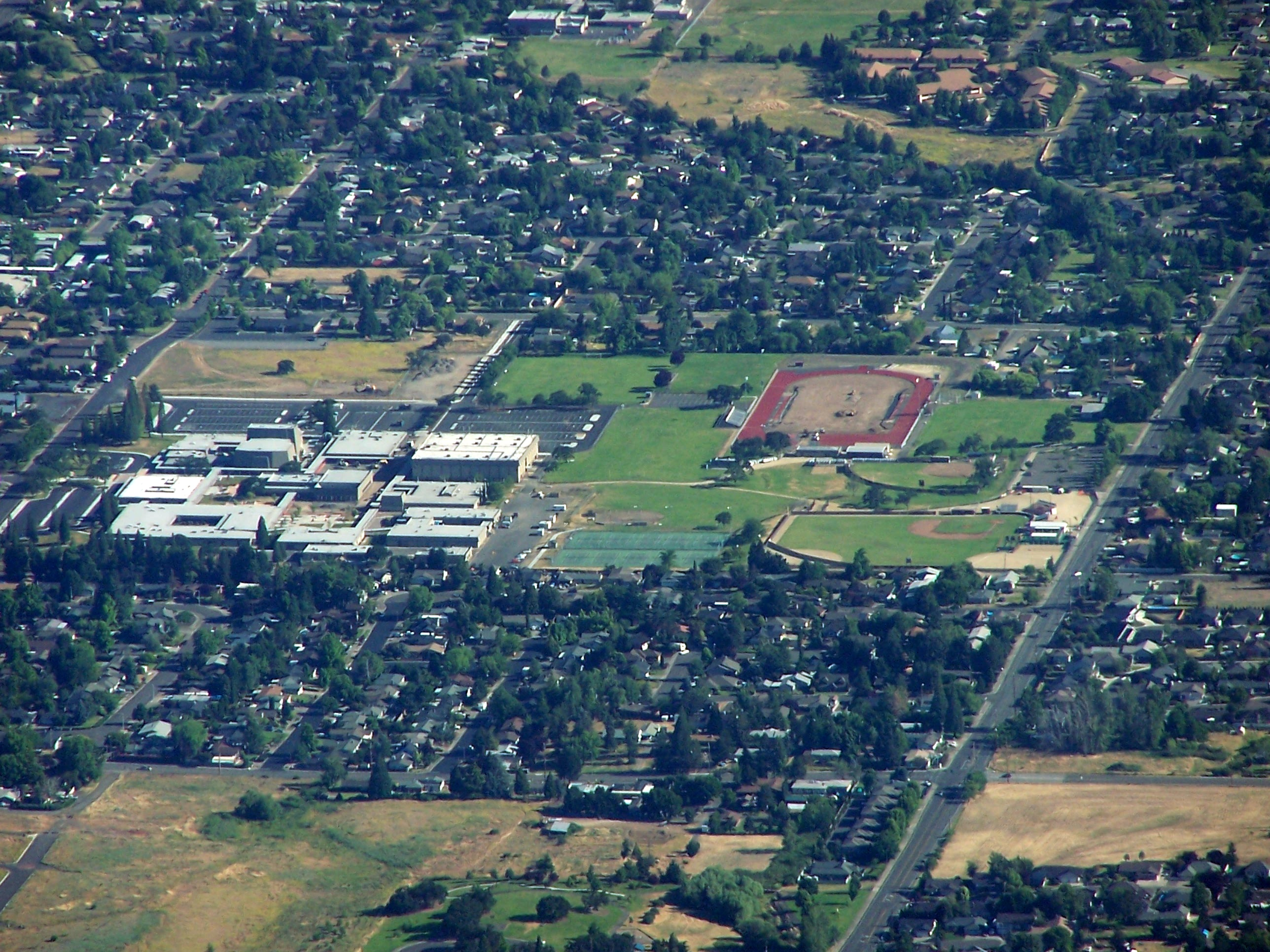
Aerial image of North Medford High School in July 2010

During the 1960s and 70s, Medford commonly put forth many state championship athletic teams in the Oregon then 3A division. However, in 1986, Medford High School was finally split into the two current high schools. Both now house around 2,000 students, similar to the number of students Medford High School collectively held in the 1970s and 1980s.

North Medford's current principal is Allen Barber.

== Campus development ==
North Medford was built in 1965. It has been remodeled and has had additions, starting in 1973 through 1981, and again in 1992. In 2007, the City of Medford passed a bond for district wide school renovations, including a complete renovation of North Medford with remodeled auditorium, administrative space, and a new library. The project was completed in early 2011. In 2025, the school gym's roof collapsed under 700,000 lbs of snow. In its stead, a building called "The Field House" has been constructed, and came into use on the 10th of October, 2025.

The school campus includes 226,712 square feet (21,062.2 m^{2}) of occupied building space with 64 classrooms. It is located on a large 61.1-acre (24.7 ha) campus, most of which is used for sports and recreation. Both North and South Medford High School share a common football stadium, Spiegelberg Stadium.

== Academics ==
Graduation rates per school year

Year	% graduation	4-year cohort total	4-year cohort adjusted	Graduated	Drop-outs	5th year	Modified diploma
2013–14	76%	445	407	311	48	33	1
2014–15	84%	439	388	324	34	23	8
2015–16	84%	412	369	309	36	14	12
2016–17	90%	430	381	344	19	2	14
2017–18	91%	475	423	385	20	5	29

Four-year cohort total is determined by the number of students initially in that class. Four-year cohort adjusted is representative of those students that did not transfer out of state, country, to private or homeschooling, or otherwise are deceased.

North Medford High School offers 17 Advanced Placement (AP) classes and opportunities for college credit through Rogue Community College and Southern Oregon University.

== Awards ==
North Medford consistently places highly among schools in contention for the OSAA's Oregonian Cup, a trophy awarded each year to the school that best exemplifies excellence in academics, activities, and athletics. The school ranked in the top 10 annually from the 2002–2003 school year to the 2008–2009 school year, winning the trophy in 2003–2004.

The school was also recognized in 2000 by the Grammy Foundation for excellence in music education, being named a Grammy Signature School.

== Sports ==
The North Medford Black Tornado participate in Oregon's 6A Southwest Conference. The school's colors are red and black. Prior to Oregon's shift from four classification level to six levels, North Medford was part of the Southern Oregon Conference (SOC) at level 4A.

=== State championships ===
Team championships

Sport	Years
Baseball	1960, 1984, 2007, 2014
Boys' basketball	1924, 1929, 1960
Football	1928 (unofficial*), 1944, 1959, 1962, 1969, 1977, 1985, 1993
Boys' golf	1951, 1952, 1966, 1967, 1971, 1973, 1979, 1980, 1981, 1982
Softball	1984, 1997, 1998, 2002, 2009, 2012, 2013, 2017
Girls' tennis	1964, 1973, 1974, 1975, 2001
Boys' tennis	1955, 1964
Boys' track and field	1940, 1941, 1942, 1943, 1948, 1949, 1950, 1951, 1953, 1954, 1955, 1956, 1957, 1964

- Oregon did not have an official state high-school football playoff until 1940.

Athletes from North Medford have won many individual state championships as well, with most occurring in the 1940s through the 1970s.

Individual championships
Sport		Event	Years
Cross county	Boys	5k	2008, 2009
Golf	Girls	Individual play	2001
Golf	Boys	Individual play	1951, 1952, 1967, 1973, 1974, 1979, 1982, 2005
Tennis	Girls	Singles	2001
Tennis	Girls	Doubles	1964, 1966, 2001, 2003
Tennis	Boys	Singles	1955, 1973
Tennis	Boys	Doubles	1960, 1963, 1995, 2007, 2008, 2009
Track and field	Girls	300m hurdles	2013, 2015
Track and field	Girls	High jump	2014
Track and field	Girls	Javelin	1981
Track and field	Girls	Long jump	1978, 1979
Track and field	Girls	Shot put	2017, 2019
Track and field	Boys	100m	2015, 2016
Track and field	Boys	110m high hurdles	1980
Track and field	Boys	200m	2016
Track and field	Boys	300m hurdles	1997
Track and field	Boys	800m	2011
Track and field	Boys	1500m	2010
Track and field	Boys	3000m	2010
Track and field	Boys	Discus	2001, 2004, 2023
Track and field	Boys	Javelin	1946, 1951, 1953, 1955
Track and field	Boys	High jump	1939, 1940, 1941, 1953, 1966, 2024
Track and field	Boys	Long jump	1956, 1957, 2018
Track and field	Boys	Pole vault	1941, 1950, 1973, 1974
Track and field	Boys	Shot put	1953, 1957, 1959, 1983
Wrestling	Girls	100 lbs	2023
Wrestling	Girls	105 lbs	2024
Wrestling	Girls	110 lbs	2018, 2021
Wrestling	Girls	115 lbs	2019
Wrestling	Girls	130 lbs	2024
Wrestling	Girls	135 lbs	2023
Wrestling	Boys	170 lbs	2015, 2016
Wrestling	Boys	195 lbs	2014
Events no longer contested
Swimming	Girls	50-yard freestyle	1980
Swimming	Girls	100-yard breaststroke	1975
Swimming	Girls	100-yard freestyle	1980
Swimming	Girls	200-yard medley relay	1980
Swimming	Boys	100-yard freestyle	1962, 1963, 1964
Swimming	Boys	200-yard freestyle	1963
Swimming	Boys	200-yard individual medley	1962
Swimming	Boys	Diving	1962, 1963, 1964
Track and field	Girls	1-mile run	1972
Track and field	Girls	440-yard relay	1966
Track and field	Boys	100-yard dash	1942, 1948, 1964
Track and field	Boys	220-yard dash	1949, 1964
Track and field	Boys	440-yard dash	1939, 1940, 1941, 1943, 1948, 1961
Track and field	Boys	880-yard dash	1947, 1956
Track and field	Boys	120-yard high hurdles	1941, 1949, 1951, 1954, 1957, 1970, 1973, 1974
Track and field	Boys	180-yard low hurdles	1951, 1956
Track and field	Boys	200-yard low hurdles	1947, 1949, 1950
Track and field	Boys	330-yard intermediate hurdles	1974
Track and field	Boys	440-yard relay	1970
Track and field	Boys	880-yard relay	1943, 1948, 1950, 1951, 1953
Track and field	Boys	1-mile relay	1973, 1974
Wrestling	Boys	115 lbs	1969, 1974
Wrestling	Boys	123 lbs	1964, 1965
Wrestling	Boys	130 lbs	1975
Wrestling	Boys	136 lbs	1962
Wrestling	Boys	141 lbs	1961
Wrestling	Boys	148 lbs	1969
Wrestling	Boys	191 lbs	1961
Wrestling	Boys	275 lbs	1962, 1964, 1965, 1966

== Notable alumni ==
- Brad Arnsberg, former baseball player, New York Yankees and Texas Rangers; earned the save for Nolan Ryan's 300th career win; pitching coach for Florida Marlins when they won 2003 World Series
- Bill Bowerman, founder of Nike, Inc., former University of Oregon track coach
- Seth Brown, baseball player for the Oakland Athletics
- Tracey Eaton, professional football player for Houston Oilers, Tennessee Titans, Atlanta Falcons
- Dick Fosbury, athlete, high jump, inventor of Fosbury Flop, and Olympic gold medalist
- Page Hamilton, founder/guitarist of band Helmet
- Marshall Holman, professional bowler
- Jon Lindstrom, actor, writer, and musician
- Danny Miles, hall of fame basketball coach
- Kellin Quinn, lead singer of rock band Sleeping With Sirens
- Lisa Rinna, actress, talk show host, reality TV personality
- Jaida Ross, NCAA record holder in the shot put
- Braden Shipley, baseball player, pitcher for Arizona Diamondbacks
- Kevin Towers, general manager of San Diego Padres 1995–2009, Arizona Diamondbacks 2010–2014
- Bob Wolcott, former baseball player
