= Jacksonville, Oregon =

- City
- Jacksonville City Hall (September 2026)
- Motto: Always a good time
- Location in Oregon
- Coordinates: 42°18′52″N 122°58′2″W
- Country: United States
- State: Oregon
- County: Jackson
- Incorporated: 1860

Area
  - Total: 1.89 sq mi (4.90 km^{2})
  - Land: 1.89 sq mi (4.90 km^{2})
  - Water: 0 sq mi (0.00 km^{2})
- Elevation: 1,569 ft (478 m)

Population (2020)
  - Total: 3,020
  - Density: 1,596.2/sq mi (616.31/km^{2})
- Time zone: UTC-8 (Pacific)
  - Summer (DST): UTC-7 (Pacific)
- ZIP code: 97530
- Area codes: 458 and 541
- FIPS code: 41-37000
- GNIS feature ID: 2410129
- Website: www.jacksonvilleor.us

Jacksonville is a city in Jackson County, Oregon, United States, approximately 5 miles (8 km) west of Medford. It was named for Jackson Creek, which flows through the community and was the site of one of the first placer gold claims in the area. It includes Jacksonville Historic District, which was designated a U.S. National Historic Landmark in 1966. As of the 2020 census, Jacksonville had a population of 3,020.

== History ==
Jacksonville was founded following discovery of gold deposits in 1851–1852. The first hanging in Southern Oregon took place in Jacksonville in the spring of 1852. With the creation of Jackson County, it became the county seat, a role which was transferred to nearby Medford in 1927.

Jacksonville was home to the first Chinatown in Oregon, founded by immigrants from San Francisco. Physical evidence of this chapter of history was uncovered early in March 2004 when road work uncovered artifacts dating to the 1850s and 1860s. Construction was halted while archeologists performed four days of rescue excavations. Their findings included broken Chinese bowls and tea cups, handmade bottles, and fragments of opium paraphernalia and Chinese coins.

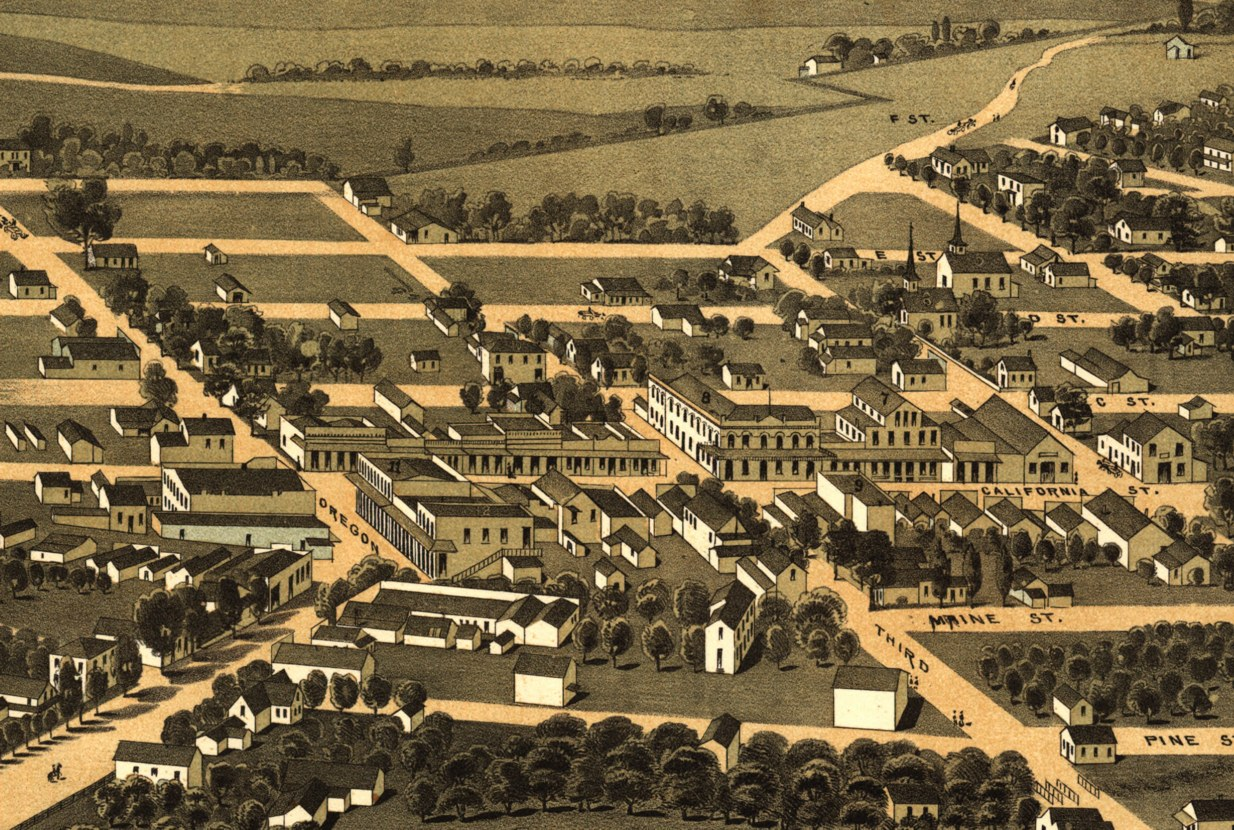
1883 lithograph of Jacksonville.

As the gold deposits were worked out in the 1860s and the railway bypassed Jacksonville in 1884, the city's economy slowed. This had the unintended benefit of preserving a number of structures, which led to Jacksonville's being designated a National Historic District in 1966, covering over 100 buildings. It was cited as a "mid-19th century inland commercial city significant for its magnificent group of surviving unaltered commercial and residential buildings. The city was the principal financial center of southern Oregon until it was bypassed by the Oregon and California Railroad."

== Geography ==
Jacksonville is in west-central Jackson County, 5 miles (8 km) west of Medford in the valley of Jackson Creek at the base of Miller Mountain. According to the United States Census Bureau, the city has a total area of 1.89 square miles (4.90 km^{2}), all land.

Climate data for Jacksonville, Oregon
Month	Jan	Feb	Mar	Apr	May	Jun	Jul	Aug	Sep	Oct	Nov	Dec	Year
Record high °F (°C)	69 (21)	81 (27)	84 (29)	91 (33)	102 (39)	109 (43)	109 (43)	111 (44)	114 (46)	102 (39)	78 (26)	71 (22)	114 (46)
Mean daily maximum °F (°C)	47 (8)	52 (11)	57 (14)	63 (17)	71 (22)	79 (26)	87 (31)	87 (31)	81 (27)	69 (21)	52 (11)	45 (7)	66 (19)
Mean daily minimum °F (°C)	30 (−1)	32 (0)	34 (1)	37 (3)	42 (6)	47 (8)	52 (11)	51 (11)	46 (8)	39 (4)	34 (1)	30 (−1)	40 (4)
Record low °F (°C)	8 (−13)	2 (−17)	18 (−8)	20 (−7)	25 (−4)	30 (−1)	34 (1)	32 (0)	22 (−6)	17 (−8)	12 (−11)	−3 (−19)	−3 (−19)
Average precipitation inches (mm)	3.14 (80)	2.57 (65)	2.38 (60)	1.64 (42)	1.40 (36)	0.77 (20)	0.41 (10)	0.54 (14)	0.86 (22)	1.68 (43)	3.38 (86)	3.49 (89)	22.26 (567)
Average snowfall inches (cm)	2.8 (7.1)	2.8 (7.1)	1.6 (4.1)	0.1 (0.25)	0 (0)	0 (0)	0 (0)	0 (0)	0 (0)	0 (0)	0.2 (0.51)	1 (2.5)	8.5 (21.56)

== Demographics ==
Historical population
Census	Pop.	Note	%±
1880	839		—
1890	743		−11.4%
1900	653		−12.1%
1910	785		20.2%
1920	489		−37.7%
1930	706		44.4%
1940	761		7.8%
1950	1,193		56.8%
1960	1,172		−1.8%
1970	1,611		37.5%
1980	2,030		26.0%
1990	1,896		−6.6%
2000	2,235		17.9%
2010	2,785		24.6%
2020	3,020		8.4%
U.S. Decennial Census

=== 2020 census ===
As of the 2020 census, Jacksonville had a population of 3,020. The median age was 60.1 years. 13.0% of residents were under the age of 18 and 42.1% of residents were 65 years of age or older. For every 100 females there were 83.6 males, and for every 100 females age 18 and over there were 81.2 males age 18 and over.

100.0% of residents lived in urban areas, while 0% lived in rural areas.

There were 1,495 households in Jacksonville, of which 16.1% had children under the age of 18 living in them. Of all households, 49.7% were married-couple households, 14.6% were households with a male householder and no spouse or partner present, and 31.5% were households with a female householder and no spouse or partner present. About 36.3% of all households were made up of individuals and 25.3% had someone living alone who was 65 years of age or older.

There were 1,651 housing units, of which 9.4% were vacant. Among occupied housing units, 71.1% were owner-occupied and 28.9% were renter-occupied. The homeowner vacancy rate was 2.2% and the rental vacancy rate was 6.8%.

Racial composition as of the 2020 census
Race	Number	Percent
White	2,723	90.2%
Black or African American	8	0.3%
American Indian and Alaska Native	13	0.4%
Asian	33	1.1%
Native Hawaiian and Other Pacific Islander	1	<0.1%
Some other race	34	1.1%
Two or more races	208	6.9%
Hispanic or Latino (of any race)	141	4.7%

=== 2010 census ===
As of the census of 2010, there were 2,785 people, 1,377 households, and 808 families residing in the city. The population density was 1,473.5 inhabitants per square mile (568.9/km^{2}). There were 1,548 housing units at an average density of 819.0 per square mile (316.2/km^{2}). The racial makeup of the city was 95.6% White, 0.4% African American, 0.6% Native American, 0.9% Asian, 0.1% Pacific Islander, 0.6% from other races, and 1.9% from two or more races. Hispanic or Latino of any race were 2.9% of the population.

There were 1,377 households, of which 18.3% had children under the age of 18 living with them, 50.5% were married couples living together, 6.1% had a female householder with no husband present, 2.0% had a male householder with no wife present, and 41.3% were non-families. 36.9% of all households were made up of individuals, and 21.1% had someone living alone who was 65 years of age or older. The average household size was 2.02 and the average family size was 2.62.

The median age in the city was 54.9 years. 15.9% of residents were under the age of 18; 4.3% were between the ages of 18 and 24; 14.8% were from 25 to 44; 35.1% were from 45 to 64; and 30% were 65 years of age or older. The gender makeup of the city was 46.2% male and 53.8% female.

=== 2000 census ===
As of the census of 2000, there were 2,235 people, 1,034 households, and 661 families residing in the city. The population density was 1,230.7 inhabitants per square mile (475.2/km^{2}). There were 1,102 housing units at an average density of 606.8 per square mile (234.3/km^{2}). The racial makeup of the city was 96.11% White, 0.72% Native American, 0.36% Asian, 0.31% African American, 0.40% from other races, and 2.10% from two or more races. Hispanic or Latino of any race were 2.46% of the population.

The largest ancestry groups in Jacksonville, Oregon, include: German (19%), English (18%), Irish (11%), Scottish (4%) and Italian (4%).

There were 1,034 households, out of which 22.2% had children under the age of 18 living with them, 54.4% were married couples living together, 7.6% had a female householder with no husband present, and 36.0% were non-families. 30.5% of all households were made up of individuals, and 18.2% had someone living alone who was 65 years of age or older. The average household size was 2.15 and the average family size was 2.68.

Jacksonville's population is spread out, with 18.9% under the age of 18, 4.3% from 18 to 24, 20.1% from 25 to 44, 32.0% from 45 to 64, and 24.7% who were 65 years of age or older. The median age was 48 years. For every 100 females, there were 84.9 males. For every 100 females age 18 and over, there were 78.7 males.

The median income for a household in the city was $41,250, and the median income for a family was $57,333. Males had a median income of $42,917 versus $28,661 for females. Jacksonville's per capita income is $28,152. About 5.3% of families and 6.6% of the population were below the poverty line, including 5.8% of those under age 18 and 8.6% of those age 65 or over.

== Education ==
Jacksonville is served by the Medford School District and is home to Jacksonville Elementary School.

== Arts and culture ==
The Great Northfield Minnesota Raid (1971) was filmed in and around Jacksonville.

Inherit The Wind (1988) a made-for television movie, starring Jason Robards and Kirk Douglas was filmed in Jacksonville.

The 1946 Technicolor film Canyon Passage takes place in Jacksonville. Though it is fiction, the location itself, a small gold mining town, is extremely important to the theme and plot.

The 2018 AnnaPura film The Sisters Brothers starring Joaquin Phoenix, Jake Gyllenhaal and John C. Reilly. Their characters pass through Jacksonville in pursuit of a bounty.

=== Annual cultural events ===
Jacksonville is home to the Britt Festival, a seasonal music festival that takes place at an open-air amphitheater. The site was selected in 1963 because of the acoustic qualities of the surrounding hills. The popular concert series draws national pop, country, alternative and contemporary music acts. It is named after Peter Britt, a pioneer and owner of the land now used for Britt Park.

=== Museums and other points of interest ===
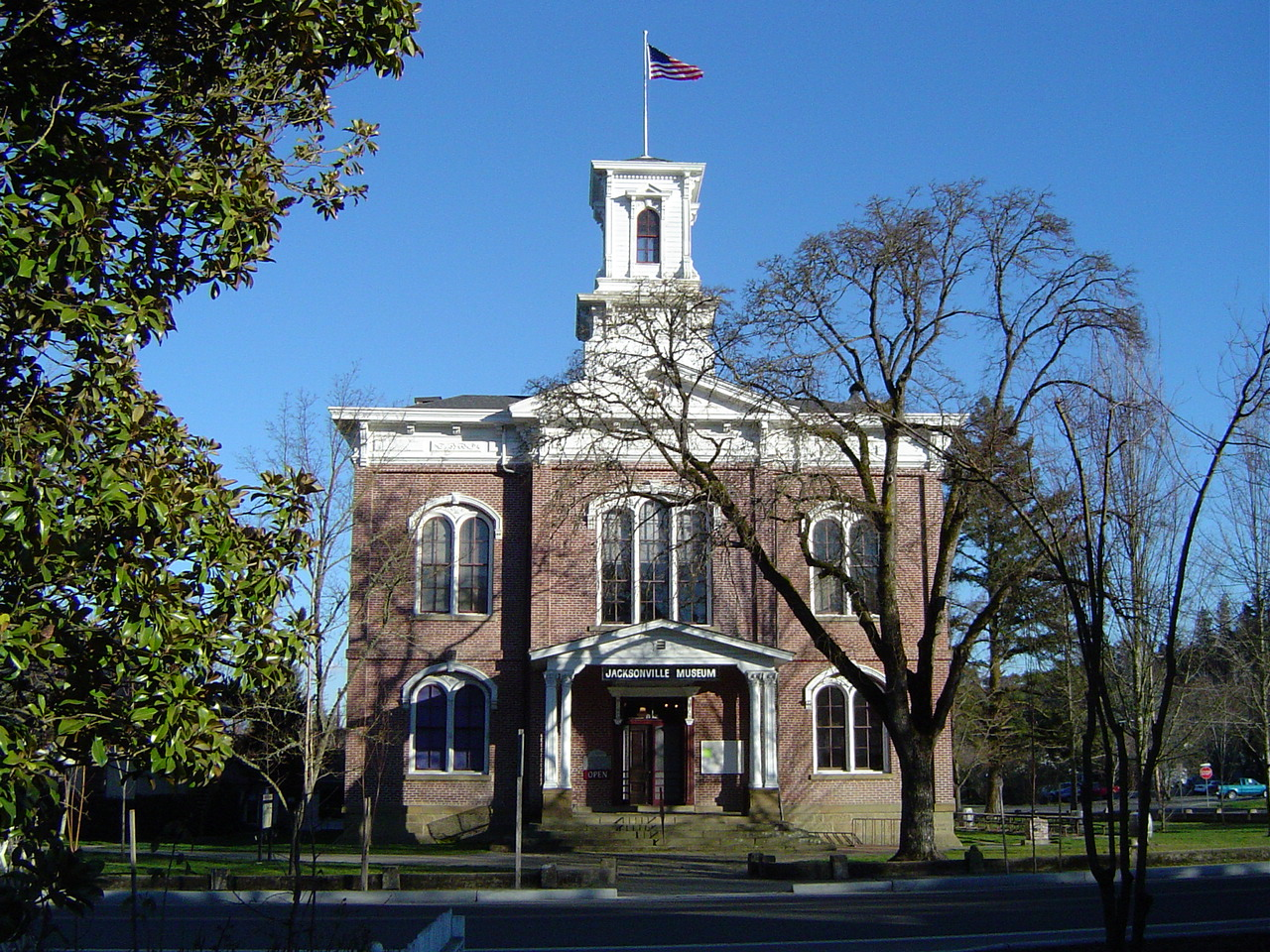
The former Jackson County Courthouse

The Southern Oregon Historical Society (SOHS) was formed in 1946 to save the endangered 1880s Jackson County Courthouse. The society opened the Jacksonville Museum in the courthouse building on July 10, 1950, and operated it until it closed in 2006 because of lack of funding; as of 2014 the courthouse, which is now owned by the City of Jacksonville, is not open to the public. The society now operates Hanley Farm in Central Point and a research library in Medford.

Named for Cornelius C. Beekman, the Beekman Native Plant Arboretum is located behind the Beekman House, a house museum owned by the City of Jacksonville and a contributing property of the historic district. Beekman House is managed by Historic Jacksonville, Inc. Other contributing properties in the district formerly owned by the SOHS and now owned by the city include the Beekman Bank, and the Catholic Rectory. The U.S. Hotel was owned by Jackson County and as of 2012 was going to be sold, with proceeds to be split by Jackson County and SOHS.

The 1859 B. F. Dowell House, a private residence and contributing property, is the oldest Italianate brick residence in Oregon.

The William Bybee House, near Jacksonville, now known as Bybee's Historic Inn, is individually listed on the National Register of Historic Places.

== Newspapers ==
- Mail Tribune in Medford (1907-2023)
- Oregon Sentinel (1855-1888)

== Notable people ==
- Kirstie Alley, actress
- Cornelius C. Beekman, early resident and banker
- Peter Britt, early resident and pioneer photographer
- Bruce Campbell, actor, producer, writer, comedian, and director
- Helen Cha-Pyo, orchestra conductor and organist
- Pinto Colvig, the original Bozo the Clown and voice of Goofy and Pluto
- Gary Dahl, creator of the Pet Rock
- Adrienne King, actress
- Beth Marion, actress
- Millie Perkins, film and television actress
- Steve Reeves, bodybuilder, actor
- John E. Ross, colonel in the Modoc War, Josephine County representative to the Oregon Territorial Legislature
- Dave Schwep, director and photographer
- John Trudeau, musician and orchestra conductor
- Kitty Wilkins, horse breeder

== Sister cities ==
Jacksonville has one sister city, as designated by Sister Cities International:

- Lawrence, New Zealand
