= Rogue Community College =

Public college in Southern Oregon, US

- Type: Community college
- Established: November 1970
- President: Randy Weber
- Location: Grants Pass, Medford, & White City, Oregon, U.S. 42.4120°N 123.3929°W
- Campus: 80 acres (32 ha)
- Sporting affiliations: NWAC
- Mascot: Ospreys
- Website: www.roguecc.edu

Rogue Community College (RCC) is a public community college with campuses in both Jackson County and Josephine County, falling roughly in the geographic region known as the Rogue Valley in Southern Oregon.

== History ==
RCC was established in November 1970 by vote of the electorate of Josephine County. On May 21, 1996, voters in Jackson and Josephine counties approved expansion of the college district's boundaries to include all of Jackson County, for the purpose of providing a wider range of educational programs, job training opportunities, and greater college access for students throughout the Rogue Valley.

The campus originally was constructed in the late 1960s as a federal training facility known as the Fort Vannoy Job Corps Training Center. The campus of wood-framed buildings was remodeled in 1989, along with several more recently constructed buildings providing additional classrooms and modern laboratory space.

Randy Weber, Ed.D., became the institution's seventh president in July 2022.

== Academics ==
RCC offers short-term certificates and associate degrees, including the Associate of Arts Oregon Transfer (AAOT) degree. Additionally, RCC has several cooperative programs with nearby Southern Oregon University, located in Ashland, Oregon.

The college is accredited by the Commission on Colleges of the Northwest Commission on Colleges and Universities. Courses and programs are approved by the Oregon Higher Education Coordinating Commission. Professional associations have accredited those professional-technical programs that require approval. RCC is approved as a veterans training institution by the Veterans Administration.

The college is a member of the American Association of Community Colleges, the Association of Community College Trustees, and the Oregon Community College Association.

== Campuses ==
RCC has campuses in the cities of Grants Pass, Oregon; Medford, Oregon; and White City, Oregon. The campus located in Grants Pass is known as the Redwood Campus, the campus located in Medford is known as the Riverside Campus, and the campus located in White City is known as the Table Rock Campus.

The Redwood Campus is located five miles (8 km) west of the city of Grants Pass on an 80 acres (32 ha) wooded site just off the Redwood Highway.

The Riverside Campus is located in downtown Medford, at ninth, Bartlett, and Riverside streets. The three-building complex houses classrooms, labs, Student and Community Services and library services. There are two additional facilities nearby: The Fir Street Learning Center at 30 S. First Street, and the D Building, located at 313 E. Eighth Street.

The Table Rock Campus opened to students Fall term 2005. It is located at 7800 Pacific Avenue, White City. The Table Rock Campus High Technology Center, which opened in September 2018, houses the Welding, Manufacturing and Mechatronics programs. The Health Professions Center, which opened in 2020, offers classroom and lab space for the college's clinical healthcare programs including the associate degree nursing (ADN) program, dental hygiene and various allied health programs.

As a public institution, RCC collects funds from property taxes, the state of Oregon, any relevant grants or levies, as well as tuition.

== Athletics ==
RCC started its athletic programs in 2013 with men's and women's soccer. The team name is the "Ospreys." In November 2014, the RCC board of trustees officially approved intercollegiate athletics at the institution and RCC joined the Northwest Athletic Conference (NWAC) starting initially with men's and women's soccer and cross country. The college discontinued its cross country and long-distance track programs in 2017 and added a women's volleyball team in 2019.

== See also ==
- List of Oregon community colleges
